

228001–228100 

|-bgcolor=#d6d6d6
| 228001 ||  || — || June 17, 2007 || Kitt Peak || Spacewatch || — || align=right | 3.8 km || 
|-id=002 bgcolor=#d6d6d6
| 228002 ||  || — || June 18, 2007 || Kitt Peak || Spacewatch || — || align=right | 5.0 km || 
|-id=003 bgcolor=#d6d6d6
| 228003 ||  || — || June 21, 2007 || Mount Lemmon || Mount Lemmon Survey || — || align=right | 4.7 km || 
|-id=004 bgcolor=#C2FFFF
| 228004 ||  || — || August 31, 2007 || Siding Spring || K. Sárneczky, L. Kiss || L4 || align=right | 9.8 km || 
|-id=005 bgcolor=#C2FFFF
| 228005 ||  || — || August 16, 2007 || XuYi || PMO NEO || L4ERY || align=right | 12 km || 
|-id=006 bgcolor=#C2FFFF
| 228006 ||  || — || September 3, 2007 || Pla D'Arguines || R. Ferrando || L4 || align=right | 14 km || 
|-id=007 bgcolor=#C2FFFF
| 228007 ||  || — || September 4, 2007 || Mount Lemmon || Mount Lemmon Survey || L4ERY || align=right | 11 km || 
|-id=008 bgcolor=#C2FFFF
| 228008 ||  || — || September 11, 2007 || Mount Lemmon || Mount Lemmon Survey || L4 || align=right | 12 km || 
|-id=009 bgcolor=#C2FFFF
| 228009 ||  || — || September 14, 2007 || Anderson Mesa || LONEOS || L4 || align=right | 13 km || 
|-id=010 bgcolor=#C2FFFF
| 228010 ||  || — || September 10, 2007 || Kitt Peak || Spacewatch || L4 || align=right | 11 km || 
|-id=011 bgcolor=#C2FFFF
| 228011 ||  || — || September 11, 2007 || Mount Lemmon || Mount Lemmon Survey || L4 || align=right | 14 km || 
|-id=012 bgcolor=#fefefe
| 228012 ||  || — || February 2, 2008 || Kitt Peak || Spacewatch || H || align=right data-sort-value="0.75" | 750 m || 
|-id=013 bgcolor=#fefefe
| 228013 ||  || — || February 24, 2008 || Kitt Peak || Spacewatch || — || align=right | 1.4 km || 
|-id=014 bgcolor=#fefefe
| 228014 ||  || — || March 4, 2008 || Kitt Peak || Spacewatch || NYS || align=right data-sort-value="0.86" | 860 m || 
|-id=015 bgcolor=#fefefe
| 228015 ||  || — || March 11, 2008 || Kitt Peak || Spacewatch || — || align=right | 1.2 km || 
|-id=016 bgcolor=#fefefe
| 228016 ||  || — || March 1, 2008 || Kitt Peak || Spacewatch || FLO || align=right data-sort-value="0.70" | 700 m || 
|-id=017 bgcolor=#fefefe
| 228017 ||  || — || March 2, 2008 || Kitt Peak || Spacewatch || — || align=right data-sort-value="0.95" | 950 m || 
|-id=018 bgcolor=#fefefe
| 228018 ||  || — || March 25, 2008 || Kitt Peak || Spacewatch || H || align=right data-sort-value="0.70" | 700 m || 
|-id=019 bgcolor=#E9E9E9
| 228019 ||  || — || March 26, 2008 || Kitt Peak || Spacewatch || — || align=right | 3.3 km || 
|-id=020 bgcolor=#fefefe
| 228020 ||  || — || March 26, 2008 || Kitt Peak || Spacewatch || — || align=right | 1.4 km || 
|-id=021 bgcolor=#E9E9E9
| 228021 ||  || — || March 26, 2008 || Kitt Peak || Spacewatch || JUN || align=right | 1.5 km || 
|-id=022 bgcolor=#fefefe
| 228022 ||  || — || March 28, 2008 || Mount Lemmon || Mount Lemmon Survey || — || align=right data-sort-value="0.89" | 890 m || 
|-id=023 bgcolor=#E9E9E9
| 228023 ||  || — || March 28, 2008 || Kitt Peak || Spacewatch || ADE || align=right | 3.4 km || 
|-id=024 bgcolor=#fefefe
| 228024 ||  || — || March 30, 2008 || Kitt Peak || Spacewatch || ERI || align=right | 1.9 km || 
|-id=025 bgcolor=#fefefe
| 228025 ||  || — || March 30, 2008 || Kitt Peak || Spacewatch || — || align=right | 1.3 km || 
|-id=026 bgcolor=#fefefe
| 228026 ||  || — || March 29, 2008 || Kitt Peak || Spacewatch || — || align=right data-sort-value="0.90" | 900 m || 
|-id=027 bgcolor=#E9E9E9
| 228027 ||  || — || March 29, 2008 || Mount Lemmon || Mount Lemmon Survey || — || align=right | 2.6 km || 
|-id=028 bgcolor=#fefefe
| 228028 ||  || — || March 31, 2008 || Kitt Peak || Spacewatch || — || align=right data-sort-value="0.97" | 970 m || 
|-id=029 bgcolor=#fefefe
| 228029 MANIAC ||  ||  || April 2, 2008 || La Cañada || J. Lacruz || — || align=right data-sort-value="0.93" | 930 m || 
|-id=030 bgcolor=#fefefe
| 228030 ||  || — || April 5, 2008 || Catalina || CSS || H || align=right | 1.00 km || 
|-id=031 bgcolor=#E9E9E9
| 228031 ||  || — || April 4, 2008 || La Sagra || OAM Obs. || — || align=right | 1.5 km || 
|-id=032 bgcolor=#fefefe
| 228032 ||  || — || April 3, 2008 || Socorro || LINEAR || — || align=right | 2.5 km || 
|-id=033 bgcolor=#E9E9E9
| 228033 ||  || — || April 4, 2008 || Kitt Peak || Spacewatch || — || align=right | 1.3 km || 
|-id=034 bgcolor=#fefefe
| 228034 ||  || — || April 4, 2008 || Catalina || CSS || NYS || align=right data-sort-value="0.94" | 940 m || 
|-id=035 bgcolor=#E9E9E9
| 228035 ||  || — || April 5, 2008 || Mount Lemmon || Mount Lemmon Survey || — || align=right | 2.4 km || 
|-id=036 bgcolor=#fefefe
| 228036 ||  || — || April 5, 2008 || Kitt Peak || Spacewatch || — || align=right data-sort-value="0.82" | 820 m || 
|-id=037 bgcolor=#fefefe
| 228037 ||  || — || April 6, 2008 || Kitt Peak || Spacewatch || — || align=right | 2.4 km || 
|-id=038 bgcolor=#E9E9E9
| 228038 ||  || — || April 7, 2008 || Kitt Peak || Spacewatch || CLO || align=right | 2.6 km || 
|-id=039 bgcolor=#E9E9E9
| 228039 ||  || — || April 7, 2008 || Kitt Peak || Spacewatch || — || align=right | 1.7 km || 
|-id=040 bgcolor=#fefefe
| 228040 ||  || — || April 8, 2008 || Kitt Peak || Spacewatch || V || align=right data-sort-value="0.90" | 900 m || 
|-id=041 bgcolor=#fefefe
| 228041 ||  || — || April 7, 2008 || Socorro || LINEAR || FLO || align=right data-sort-value="0.88" | 880 m || 
|-id=042 bgcolor=#E9E9E9
| 228042 ||  || — || April 11, 2008 || Kitt Peak || Spacewatch || EUN || align=right | 1.4 km || 
|-id=043 bgcolor=#fefefe
| 228043 ||  || — || April 6, 2008 || Kitt Peak || Spacewatch || — || align=right data-sort-value="0.89" | 890 m || 
|-id=044 bgcolor=#fefefe
| 228044 ||  || — || April 24, 2008 || Kitt Peak || Spacewatch || NYS || align=right data-sort-value="0.76" | 760 m || 
|-id=045 bgcolor=#d6d6d6
| 228045 ||  || — || April 24, 2008 || Kitt Peak || Spacewatch || — || align=right | 6.1 km || 
|-id=046 bgcolor=#E9E9E9
| 228046 ||  || — || April 26, 2008 || Kitt Peak || Spacewatch || RAF || align=right | 1.3 km || 
|-id=047 bgcolor=#fefefe
| 228047 ||  || — || April 26, 2008 || Kitt Peak || Spacewatch || H || align=right data-sort-value="0.67" | 670 m || 
|-id=048 bgcolor=#fefefe
| 228048 ||  || — || April 26, 2008 || Kitt Peak || Spacewatch || FLO || align=right data-sort-value="0.77" | 770 m || 
|-id=049 bgcolor=#E9E9E9
| 228049 ||  || — || April 29, 2008 || Kitt Peak || Spacewatch || — || align=right | 1.5 km || 
|-id=050 bgcolor=#fefefe
| 228050 ||  || — || April 27, 2008 || Kitt Peak || Spacewatch || — || align=right | 1.3 km || 
|-id=051 bgcolor=#fefefe
| 228051 ||  || — || April 30, 2008 || Kitt Peak || Spacewatch || V || align=right data-sort-value="0.90" | 900 m || 
|-id=052 bgcolor=#fefefe
| 228052 ||  || — || April 26, 2008 || Mount Lemmon || Mount Lemmon Survey || — || align=right data-sort-value="0.82" | 820 m || 
|-id=053 bgcolor=#E9E9E9
| 228053 ||  || — || April 29, 2008 || Kitt Peak || Spacewatch || — || align=right | 1.8 km || 
|-id=054 bgcolor=#fefefe
| 228054 ||  || — || April 30, 2008 || Catalina || CSS || — || align=right data-sort-value="0.97" | 970 m || 
|-id=055 bgcolor=#fefefe
| 228055 ||  || — || May 3, 2008 || Kitt Peak || Spacewatch || — || align=right | 1.3 km || 
|-id=056 bgcolor=#fefefe
| 228056 ||  || — || May 3, 2008 || Kitt Peak || Spacewatch || — || align=right data-sort-value="0.94" | 940 m || 
|-id=057 bgcolor=#fefefe
| 228057 ||  || — || May 6, 2008 || Vicques || M. Ory || MAS || align=right data-sort-value="0.93" | 930 m || 
|-id=058 bgcolor=#fefefe
| 228058 ||  || — || May 8, 2008 || Socorro || LINEAR || — || align=right | 1.3 km || 
|-id=059 bgcolor=#E9E9E9
| 228059 ||  || — || May 14, 2008 || Catalina || CSS || — || align=right | 1.6 km || 
|-id=060 bgcolor=#fefefe
| 228060 || 2008 KB || — || May 25, 2008 || Jarnac || Jarnac Obs. || — || align=right data-sort-value="0.90" | 900 m || 
|-id=061 bgcolor=#E9E9E9
| 228061 ||  || — || May 27, 2008 || Kitt Peak || Spacewatch || — || align=right | 2.6 km || 
|-id=062 bgcolor=#E9E9E9
| 228062 ||  || — || May 28, 2008 || Kitt Peak || Spacewatch || — || align=right | 2.5 km || 
|-id=063 bgcolor=#E9E9E9
| 228063 || 2008 LU || — || June 1, 2008 || Mount Lemmon || Mount Lemmon Survey || — || align=right | 1.2 km || 
|-id=064 bgcolor=#d6d6d6
| 228064 ||  || — || June 8, 2008 || Needville || J. Dellinger || BRA || align=right | 2.4 km || 
|-id=065 bgcolor=#E9E9E9
| 228065 ||  || — || June 6, 2008 || Kitt Peak || Spacewatch || — || align=right | 2.5 km || 
|-id=066 bgcolor=#E9E9E9
| 228066 ||  || — || July 26, 2008 || La Sagra || OAM Obs. || — || align=right | 2.0 km || 
|-id=067 bgcolor=#d6d6d6
| 228067 ||  || — || July 29, 2008 || Mount Lemmon || Mount Lemmon Survey || — || align=right | 5.1 km || 
|-id=068 bgcolor=#E9E9E9
| 228068 ||  || — || July 29, 2008 || La Sagra || OAM Obs. || — || align=right | 2.1 km || 
|-id=069 bgcolor=#d6d6d6
| 228069 ||  || — || July 29, 2008 || La Sagra || OAM Obs. || — || align=right | 4.0 km || 
|-id=070 bgcolor=#d6d6d6
| 228070 ||  || — || July 26, 2008 || Siding Spring || SSS || EOS || align=right | 2.6 km || 
|-id=071 bgcolor=#C2FFFF
| 228071 ||  || — || July 30, 2008 || Kitt Peak || Spacewatch || L4 || align=right | 9.2 km || 
|-id=072 bgcolor=#d6d6d6
| 228072 ||  || — || August 3, 2008 || Dauban || F. Kugel || KOR || align=right | 1.9 km || 
|-id=073 bgcolor=#d6d6d6
| 228073 ||  || — || August 4, 2008 || La Sagra || OAM Obs. || — || align=right | 4.7 km || 
|-id=074 bgcolor=#d6d6d6
| 228074 ||  || — || August 5, 2008 || La Sagra || OAM Obs. || — || align=right | 5.2 km || 
|-id=075 bgcolor=#d6d6d6
| 228075 ||  || — || August 7, 2008 || Tiki || N. Teamo || — || align=right | 4.1 km || 
|-id=076 bgcolor=#d6d6d6
| 228076 ||  || — || August 10, 2008 || La Sagra || OAM Obs. || THM || align=right | 2.7 km || 
|-id=077 bgcolor=#C2FFFF
| 228077 ||  || — || August 25, 2008 || Dauban || F. Kugel || L4 || align=right | 14 km || 
|-id=078 bgcolor=#d6d6d6
| 228078 ||  || — || August 25, 2008 || Piszkéstető || K. Sárneczky || — || align=right | 2.4 km || 
|-id=079 bgcolor=#d6d6d6
| 228079 ||  || — || August 26, 2008 || La Sagra || OAM Obs. || — || align=right | 3.1 km || 
|-id=080 bgcolor=#d6d6d6
| 228080 ||  || — || August 27, 2008 || La Sagra || OAM Obs. || — || align=right | 3.6 km || 
|-id=081 bgcolor=#d6d6d6
| 228081 ||  || — || August 31, 2008 || La Sagra || OAM Obs. || — || align=right | 4.1 km || 
|-id=082 bgcolor=#d6d6d6
| 228082 ||  || — || August 30, 2008 || Socorro || LINEAR || — || align=right | 4.4 km || 
|-id=083 bgcolor=#d6d6d6
| 228083 ||  || — || August 24, 2008 || Kitt Peak || Spacewatch || CHA || align=right | 2.7 km || 
|-id=084 bgcolor=#C2FFFF
| 228084 ||  || — || September 2, 2008 || Kitt Peak || Spacewatch || L4 || align=right | 9.0 km || 
|-id=085 bgcolor=#C2FFFF
| 228085 ||  || — || September 2, 2008 || Kitt Peak || Spacewatch || L4 || align=right | 11 km || 
|-id=086 bgcolor=#C2FFFF
| 228086 ||  || — || September 9, 2008 || Bergisch Gladbach || W. Bickel || L4 || align=right | 12 km || 
|-id=087 bgcolor=#d6d6d6
| 228087 ||  || — || September 2, 2008 || La Sagra || OAM Obs. || EOS || align=right | 3.7 km || 
|-id=088 bgcolor=#C2FFFF
| 228088 ||  || — || September 6, 2008 || Mount Lemmon || Mount Lemmon Survey || L4 || align=right | 9.8 km || 
|-id=089 bgcolor=#C2FFFF
| 228089 ||  || — || September 4, 2008 || Kitt Peak || Spacewatch || L4 || align=right | 10 km || 
|-id=090 bgcolor=#C2FFFF
| 228090 ||  || — || September 5, 2008 || Kitt Peak || Spacewatch || L4 || align=right | 11 km || 
|-id=091 bgcolor=#d6d6d6
| 228091 ||  || — || September 23, 2008 || Hibiscus || N. Teamo || — || align=right | 4.6 km || 
|-id=092 bgcolor=#E9E9E9
| 228092 ||  || — || September 22, 2008 || Socorro || LINEAR || — || align=right | 3.8 km || 
|-id=093 bgcolor=#d6d6d6
| 228093 ||  || — || September 22, 2008 || Socorro || LINEAR || 3:2 || align=right | 7.3 km || 
|-id=094 bgcolor=#d6d6d6
| 228094 ||  || — || September 19, 2008 || Kitt Peak || Spacewatch || KOR || align=right | 1.7 km || 
|-id=095 bgcolor=#C2FFFF
| 228095 ||  || — || September 19, 2008 || Kitt Peak || Spacewatch || L4 || align=right | 10 km || 
|-id=096 bgcolor=#C2FFFF
| 228096 ||  || — || September 19, 2008 || Kitt Peak || Spacewatch || L4 || align=right | 11 km || 
|-id=097 bgcolor=#C2FFFF
| 228097 ||  || — || September 20, 2008 || Kitt Peak || Spacewatch || L4ERY || align=right | 10 km || 
|-id=098 bgcolor=#C2FFFF
| 228098 ||  || — || September 20, 2008 || Kitt Peak || Spacewatch || L4ERY || align=right | 10 km || 
|-id=099 bgcolor=#C2FFFF
| 228099 ||  || — || September 20, 2008 || Mount Lemmon || Mount Lemmon Survey || L4 || align=right | 8.6 km || 
|-id=100 bgcolor=#E9E9E9
| 228100 ||  || — || September 28, 2008 || Farra d'Isonzo || Farra d'Isonzo || — || align=right | 3.2 km || 
|}

228101–228200 

|-bgcolor=#C2FFFF
| 228101 ||  || — || September 22, 2008 || Socorro || LINEAR || L4 || align=right | 13 km || 
|-id=102 bgcolor=#C2FFFF
| 228102 ||  || — || September 22, 2008 || Catalina || CSS || L4 || align=right | 18 km || 
|-id=103 bgcolor=#C2FFFF
| 228103 ||  || — || September 25, 2008 || Kitt Peak || Spacewatch || L4 || align=right | 13 km || 
|-id=104 bgcolor=#C2FFFF
| 228104 ||  || — || September 25, 2008 || Kitt Peak || Spacewatch || L4 || align=right | 11 km || 
|-id=105 bgcolor=#C2FFFF
| 228105 ||  || — || September 26, 2008 || Kitt Peak || Spacewatch || L4 || align=right | 11 km || 
|-id=106 bgcolor=#C2FFFF
| 228106 ||  || — || September 28, 2008 || Mount Lemmon || Mount Lemmon Survey || L4 || align=right | 15 km || 
|-id=107 bgcolor=#C2FFFF
| 228107 ||  || — || September 28, 2008 || Mount Lemmon || Mount Lemmon Survey || L4 || align=right | 9.1 km || 
|-id=108 bgcolor=#C2FFFF
| 228108 ||  || — || September 25, 2008 || Mount Lemmon || Mount Lemmon Survey || L4 || align=right | 12 km || 
|-id=109 bgcolor=#d6d6d6
| 228109 ||  || — || October 1, 2008 || La Sagra || OAM Obs. || — || align=right | 3.6 km || 
|-id=110 bgcolor=#C2FFFF
| 228110 Eudorus ||  ||  || October 7, 2008 || Calvin-Rehoboth || L. A. Molnar || L4 || align=right | 10 km || 
|-id=111 bgcolor=#C2FFFF
| 228111 ||  || — || October 8, 2008 || Desert Moon || B. L. Stevens || L4 || align=right | 10 km || 
|-id=112 bgcolor=#C2FFFF
| 228112 ||  || — || October 1, 2008 || Mount Lemmon || Mount Lemmon Survey || L4 || align=right | 11 km || 
|-id=113 bgcolor=#C2FFFF
| 228113 ||  || — || October 2, 2008 || Kitt Peak || Spacewatch || L4 || align=right | 13 km || 
|-id=114 bgcolor=#C2FFFF
| 228114 ||  || — || October 2, 2008 || Catalina || CSS || L4 || align=right | 17 km || 
|-id=115 bgcolor=#C2FFFF
| 228115 ||  || — || October 2, 2008 || Mount Lemmon || Mount Lemmon Survey || L4ERY || align=right | 13 km || 
|-id=116 bgcolor=#C2FFFF
| 228116 ||  || — || October 3, 2008 || La Sagra || OAM Obs. || L4ERY || align=right | 13 km || 
|-id=117 bgcolor=#C2FFFF
| 228117 ||  || — || October 5, 2008 || La Sagra || OAM Obs. || L4 || align=right | 12 km || 
|-id=118 bgcolor=#C2FFFF
| 228118 ||  || — || October 6, 2008 || Catalina || CSS || L4 || align=right | 14 km || 
|-id=119 bgcolor=#C2FFFF
| 228119 ||  || — || October 8, 2008 || Kitt Peak || Spacewatch || L4 || align=right | 11 km || 
|-id=120 bgcolor=#C2FFFF
| 228120 ||  || — || October 8, 2008 || Mount Lemmon || Mount Lemmon Survey || L4 || align=right | 12 km || 
|-id=121 bgcolor=#C2FFFF
| 228121 ||  || — || October 9, 2008 || Kitt Peak || Spacewatch || L4 || align=right | 8.2 km || 
|-id=122 bgcolor=#C2FFFF
| 228122 ||  || — || October 17, 2008 || Kitt Peak || Spacewatch || L4 || align=right | 10 km || 
|-id=123 bgcolor=#C2FFFF
| 228123 ||  || — || October 20, 2008 || Mount Lemmon || Mount Lemmon Survey || L4 || align=right | 9.2 km || 
|-id=124 bgcolor=#C2FFFF
| 228124 ||  || — || December 23, 2008 || Calar Alto || F. Hormuth || L4 || align=right | 13 km || 
|-id=125 bgcolor=#C2FFFF
| 228125 ||  || — || December 31, 2008 || Catalina || CSS || L4 || align=right | 17 km || 
|-id=126 bgcolor=#d6d6d6
| 228126 ||  || — || July 19, 2009 || Siding Spring || SSS || Tj (2.92) || align=right | 6.7 km || 
|-id=127 bgcolor=#fefefe
| 228127 || 2009 PL || — || August 11, 2009 || Marly || P. Kocher || — || align=right | 1.0 km || 
|-id=128 bgcolor=#fefefe
| 228128 ||  || — || August 15, 2009 || Catalina || CSS || NYS || align=right | 1.0 km || 
|-id=129 bgcolor=#E9E9E9
| 228129 ||  || — || August 15, 2009 || Catalina || CSS || — || align=right | 3.5 km || 
|-id=130 bgcolor=#fefefe
| 228130 ||  || — || August 15, 2009 || Catalina || CSS || MAS || align=right | 1.1 km || 
|-id=131 bgcolor=#E9E9E9
| 228131 ||  || — || August 16, 2009 || La Sagra || OAM Obs. || — || align=right | 2.8 km || 
|-id=132 bgcolor=#fefefe
| 228132 ||  || — || August 16, 2009 || Kitt Peak || Spacewatch || — || align=right | 1.0 km || 
|-id=133 bgcolor=#fefefe
| 228133 Ripoll ||  ||  || August 20, 2009 || La Sagra || OAM Obs. || NYS || align=right data-sort-value="0.67" | 670 m || 
|-id=134 bgcolor=#E9E9E9
| 228134 ||  || — || August 27, 2009 || La Sagra || OAM Obs. || — || align=right | 4.0 km || 
|-id=135 bgcolor=#E9E9E9
| 228135 Sodnik ||  ||  || September 13, 2009 || ESA OGS || M. Busch, R. Kresken || AGN || align=right | 1.3 km || 
|-id=136 bgcolor=#fefefe
| 228136 Billary ||  ||  || September 13, 2009 || ESA OGS || M. Busch, R. Kresken || — || align=right | 1.1 km || 
|-id=137 bgcolor=#d6d6d6
| 228137 ||  || — || September 14, 2009 || Kitt Peak || Spacewatch || KOR || align=right | 1.3 km || 
|-id=138 bgcolor=#fefefe
| 228138 ||  || — || September 14, 2009 || Kitt Peak || Spacewatch || V || align=right data-sort-value="0.83" | 830 m || 
|-id=139 bgcolor=#E9E9E9
| 228139 ||  || — || September 14, 2009 || Kitt Peak || Spacewatch || — || align=right | 1.7 km || 
|-id=140 bgcolor=#C2FFFF
| 228140 ||  || — || September 14, 2009 || Kitt Peak || Spacewatch || L4 || align=right | 14 km || 
|-id=141 bgcolor=#d6d6d6
| 228141 ||  || — || September 15, 2009 || Kitt Peak || Spacewatch || — || align=right | 3.4 km || 
|-id=142 bgcolor=#fefefe
| 228142 ||  || — || September 15, 2009 || Kitt Peak || Spacewatch || — || align=right data-sort-value="0.92" | 920 m || 
|-id=143 bgcolor=#d6d6d6
| 228143 ||  || — || September 15, 2009 || Kitt Peak || Spacewatch || — || align=right | 2.8 km || 
|-id=144 bgcolor=#d6d6d6
| 228144 ||  || — || September 15, 2009 || Kitt Peak || Spacewatch || — || align=right | 2.6 km || 
|-id=145 bgcolor=#fefefe
| 228145 ||  || — || September 15, 2009 || Kitt Peak || Spacewatch || — || align=right data-sort-value="0.84" | 840 m || 
|-id=146 bgcolor=#fefefe
| 228146 ||  || — || September 15, 2009 || Kitt Peak || Spacewatch || NYS || align=right data-sort-value="0.81" | 810 m || 
|-id=147 bgcolor=#E9E9E9
| 228147 ||  || — || September 21, 2009 || La Sagra || OAM Obs. || — || align=right | 2.0 km || 
|-id=148 bgcolor=#C2FFFF
| 228148 ||  || — || September 22, 2009 || Taunus || S. Karge, U. Zimmer || L4 || align=right | 13 km || 
|-id=149 bgcolor=#fefefe
| 228149 ||  || — || September 16, 2009 || Kitt Peak || Spacewatch || NYS || align=right data-sort-value="0.83" | 830 m || 
|-id=150 bgcolor=#C2FFFF
| 228150 ||  || — || September 16, 2009 || Kitt Peak || Spacewatch || L4 || align=right | 10 km || 
|-id=151 bgcolor=#d6d6d6
| 228151 ||  || — || September 16, 2009 || Kitt Peak || Spacewatch || THM || align=right | 3.4 km || 
|-id=152 bgcolor=#fefefe
| 228152 ||  || — || September 16, 2009 || Kitt Peak || Spacewatch || — || align=right | 1.2 km || 
|-id=153 bgcolor=#E9E9E9
| 228153 ||  || — || September 16, 2009 || Kitt Peak || Spacewatch || — || align=right | 3.7 km || 
|-id=154 bgcolor=#fefefe
| 228154 ||  || — || September 16, 2009 || Mount Lemmon || Mount Lemmon Survey || — || align=right data-sort-value="0.66" | 660 m || 
|-id=155 bgcolor=#C2FFFF
| 228155 ||  || — || September 17, 2009 || Kitt Peak || Spacewatch || L4 || align=right | 16 km || 
|-id=156 bgcolor=#E9E9E9
| 228156 ||  || — || September 17, 2009 || Kitt Peak || Spacewatch || VIB || align=right | 2.0 km || 
|-id=157 bgcolor=#d6d6d6
| 228157 ||  || — || September 18, 2009 || Kitt Peak || Spacewatch || — || align=right | 6.5 km || 
|-id=158 bgcolor=#d6d6d6
| 228158 Mamankei ||  ||  || September 19, 2009 || XuYi || PMO NEO || — || align=right | 5.7 km || 
|-id=159 bgcolor=#fefefe
| 228159 ||  || — || September 18, 2009 || Kitt Peak || Spacewatch || — || align=right | 1.1 km || 
|-id=160 bgcolor=#fefefe
| 228160 ||  || — || September 18, 2009 || Kitt Peak || Spacewatch || MAS || align=right data-sort-value="0.80" | 800 m || 
|-id=161 bgcolor=#E9E9E9
| 228161 ||  || — || September 18, 2009 || Kitt Peak || Spacewatch || HEN || align=right | 1.1 km || 
|-id=162 bgcolor=#C2FFFF
| 228162 ||  || — || September 19, 2009 || Kitt Peak || Spacewatch || L4 || align=right | 10 km || 
|-id=163 bgcolor=#d6d6d6
| 228163 ||  || — || September 19, 2009 || Kitt Peak || Spacewatch || — || align=right | 4.0 km || 
|-id=164 bgcolor=#fefefe
| 228164 ||  || — || September 22, 2009 || Kitt Peak || Spacewatch || — || align=right data-sort-value="0.81" | 810 m || 
|-id=165 bgcolor=#E9E9E9
| 228165 Mezentsev ||  ||  || September 26, 2009 || Tzec Maun || D. Chestnov, A. Novichonok || — || align=right | 2.4 km || 
|-id=166 bgcolor=#fefefe
| 228166 ||  || — || September 23, 2009 || Mount Lemmon || Mount Lemmon Survey || — || align=right | 1.1 km || 
|-id=167 bgcolor=#d6d6d6
| 228167 ||  || — || September 21, 2009 || Kitt Peak || Spacewatch || — || align=right | 3.4 km || 
|-id=168 bgcolor=#fefefe
| 228168 ||  || — || September 21, 2009 || Pises || Pises Obs. || FLO || align=right data-sort-value="0.82" | 820 m || 
|-id=169 bgcolor=#d6d6d6
| 228169 ||  || — || September 22, 2009 || Kitt Peak || Spacewatch || — || align=right | 4.8 km || 
|-id=170 bgcolor=#E9E9E9
| 228170 ||  || — || September 22, 2009 || Kitt Peak || Spacewatch || — || align=right | 1.3 km || 
|-id=171 bgcolor=#E9E9E9
| 228171 ||  || — || September 23, 2009 || Kitt Peak || Spacewatch || — || align=right | 1.1 km || 
|-id=172 bgcolor=#E9E9E9
| 228172 ||  || — || September 23, 2009 || Kitt Peak || Spacewatch || — || align=right | 1.9 km || 
|-id=173 bgcolor=#d6d6d6
| 228173 ||  || — || September 19, 2009 || Catalina || CSS || EOS || align=right | 3.4 km || 
|-id=174 bgcolor=#d6d6d6
| 228174 ||  || — || September 19, 2009 || Catalina || CSS || — || align=right | 3.7 km || 
|-id=175 bgcolor=#fefefe
| 228175 ||  || — || September 23, 2009 || Mount Lemmon || Mount Lemmon Survey || — || align=right | 1.1 km || 
|-id=176 bgcolor=#fefefe
| 228176 ||  || — || September 23, 2009 || Mount Lemmon || Mount Lemmon Survey || — || align=right data-sort-value="0.97" | 970 m || 
|-id=177 bgcolor=#d6d6d6
| 228177 ||  || — || September 25, 2009 || Kitt Peak || Spacewatch || HYG || align=right | 3.3 km || 
|-id=178 bgcolor=#E9E9E9
| 228178 ||  || — || September 25, 2009 || Mount Lemmon || Mount Lemmon Survey || — || align=right | 1.8 km || 
|-id=179 bgcolor=#fefefe
| 228179 ||  || — || October 13, 2009 || Mayhill || A. Lowe || MAS || align=right data-sort-value="0.84" | 840 m || 
|-id=180 bgcolor=#fefefe
| 228180 Puertollano ||  ||  || October 11, 2009 || La Sagra || OAM Obs. || — || align=right data-sort-value="0.96" | 960 m || 
|-id=181 bgcolor=#d6d6d6
| 228181 ||  || — || October 12, 2009 || La Sagra || OAM Obs. || — || align=right | 3.5 km || 
|-id=182 bgcolor=#fefefe
| 228182 ||  || — || October 11, 2009 || Mount Lemmon || Mount Lemmon Survey || NYS || align=right | 2.2 km || 
|-id=183 bgcolor=#E9E9E9
| 228183 ||  || — || October 11, 2009 || La Sagra || OAM Obs. || — || align=right | 2.0 km || 
|-id=184 bgcolor=#fefefe
| 228184 ||  || — || October 11, 2009 || La Sagra || OAM Obs. || V || align=right data-sort-value="0.95" | 950 m || 
|-id=185 bgcolor=#fefefe
| 228185 ||  || — || October 14, 2009 || La Sagra || OAM Obs. || — || align=right | 1.1 km || 
|-id=186 bgcolor=#fefefe
| 228186 ||  || — || October 15, 2009 || La Sagra || OAM Obs. || FLO || align=right | 1.3 km || 
|-id=187 bgcolor=#d6d6d6
| 228187 ||  || — || October 14, 2009 || La Sagra || OAM Obs. || — || align=right | 4.0 km || 
|-id=188 bgcolor=#E9E9E9
| 228188 ||  || — || October 22, 2009 || Bisei SG Center || BATTeRS || — || align=right | 2.1 km || 
|-id=189 bgcolor=#fefefe
| 228189 ||  || — || October 22, 2009 || Mount Lemmon || Mount Lemmon Survey || — || align=right | 1.1 km || 
|-id=190 bgcolor=#d6d6d6
| 228190 ||  || — || October 22, 2009 || Mount Lemmon || Mount Lemmon Survey || — || align=right | 3.8 km || 
|-id=191 bgcolor=#E9E9E9
| 228191 ||  || — || October 23, 2009 || Kitt Peak || Spacewatch || WIT || align=right | 1.4 km || 
|-id=192 bgcolor=#E9E9E9
| 228192 ||  || — || October 23, 2009 || Mount Lemmon || Mount Lemmon Survey || — || align=right | 1.8 km || 
|-id=193 bgcolor=#d6d6d6
| 228193 || 2693 P-L || — || September 24, 1960 || Palomar || PLS || — || align=right | 4.8 km || 
|-id=194 bgcolor=#E9E9E9
| 228194 || 3046 P-L || — || September 24, 1960 || Palomar || PLS || — || align=right | 2.0 km || 
|-id=195 bgcolor=#E9E9E9
| 228195 || 6675 P-L || — || September 24, 1960 || Palomar || PLS || — || align=right | 1.6 km || 
|-id=196 bgcolor=#d6d6d6
| 228196 || 7574 P-L || — || October 17, 1960 || Palomar || PLS || — || align=right | 4.3 km || 
|-id=197 bgcolor=#E9E9E9
| 228197 || 2149 T-3 || — || October 16, 1977 || Palomar || PLS || — || align=right | 4.3 km || 
|-id=198 bgcolor=#fefefe
| 228198 || 3200 T-3 || — || October 16, 1977 || Palomar || PLS || — || align=right | 1.3 km || 
|-id=199 bgcolor=#d6d6d6
| 228199 || 3765 T-3 || — || October 16, 1977 || Palomar || PLS || — || align=right | 4.8 km || 
|-id=200 bgcolor=#E9E9E9
| 228200 || 4088 T-3 || — || October 16, 1977 || Palomar || PLS || PAE || align=right | 3.5 km || 
|}

228201–228300 

|-bgcolor=#E9E9E9
| 228201 || 4106 T-3 || — || October 16, 1977 || Palomar || PLS || — || align=right | 2.1 km || 
|-id=202 bgcolor=#E9E9E9
| 228202 || 5058 T-3 || — || October 16, 1977 || Palomar || PLS || — || align=right | 3.5 km || 
|-id=203 bgcolor=#d6d6d6
| 228203 || 5772 T-3 || — || October 16, 1977 || Palomar || PLS || — || align=right | 5.1 km || 
|-id=204 bgcolor=#d6d6d6
| 228204 ||  || — || November 10, 1993 || Kitt Peak || Spacewatch || — || align=right | 5.0 km || 
|-id=205 bgcolor=#E9E9E9
| 228205 ||  || — || May 1, 1994 || Kitt Peak || Spacewatch || — || align=right | 1.2 km || 
|-id=206 bgcolor=#d6d6d6
| 228206 ||  || — || January 29, 1995 || Kitt Peak || Spacewatch || — || align=right | 3.3 km || 
|-id=207 bgcolor=#d6d6d6
| 228207 ||  || — || February 1, 1995 || Kitt Peak || Spacewatch || — || align=right | 2.7 km || 
|-id=208 bgcolor=#fefefe
| 228208 ||  || — || June 24, 1995 || Kitt Peak || Spacewatch || — || align=right | 1.1 km || 
|-id=209 bgcolor=#fefefe
| 228209 ||  || — || October 15, 1995 || Kitt Peak || Spacewatch || — || align=right data-sort-value="0.87" | 870 m || 
|-id=210 bgcolor=#E9E9E9
| 228210 ||  || — || October 19, 1995 || Kitt Peak || Spacewatch || HOF || align=right | 3.4 km || 
|-id=211 bgcolor=#E9E9E9
| 228211 ||  || — || November 14, 1995 || Kitt Peak || Spacewatch || — || align=right | 2.5 km || 
|-id=212 bgcolor=#fefefe
| 228212 ||  || — || December 18, 1995 || Kitt Peak || Spacewatch || V || align=right | 1.0 km || 
|-id=213 bgcolor=#fefefe
| 228213 ||  || — || December 22, 1995 || Kitt Peak || Spacewatch || FLO || align=right | 1.0 km || 
|-id=214 bgcolor=#fefefe
| 228214 ||  || — || January 12, 1996 || Kitt Peak || Spacewatch || NYS || align=right data-sort-value="0.73" | 730 m || 
|-id=215 bgcolor=#fefefe
| 228215 ||  || — || February 26, 1996 || Siding Spring || G. J. Garradd || NYS || align=right data-sort-value="0.74" | 740 m || 
|-id=216 bgcolor=#d6d6d6
| 228216 ||  || — || June 11, 1996 || Kitt Peak || Spacewatch || — || align=right | 4.9 km || 
|-id=217 bgcolor=#E9E9E9
| 228217 ||  || — || September 13, 1996 || Kitt Peak || Spacewatch || — || align=right | 1.3 km || 
|-id=218 bgcolor=#d6d6d6
| 228218 ||  || — || October 4, 1996 || Kitt Peak || Spacewatch || VER || align=right | 5.3 km || 
|-id=219 bgcolor=#E9E9E9
| 228219 ||  || — || November 5, 1996 || Kitt Peak || Spacewatch || — || align=right | 2.1 km || 
|-id=220 bgcolor=#fefefe
| 228220 ||  || — || November 10, 1996 || Kitt Peak || Spacewatch || FLO || align=right data-sort-value="0.73" | 730 m || 
|-id=221 bgcolor=#E9E9E9
| 228221 ||  || — || December 1, 1996 || Kitt Peak || Spacewatch || — || align=right | 1.9 km || 
|-id=222 bgcolor=#E9E9E9
| 228222 ||  || — || December 14, 1996 || Kitt Peak || Spacewatch || — || align=right | 1.6 km || 
|-id=223 bgcolor=#fefefe
| 228223 ||  || — || April 3, 1997 || Socorro || LINEAR || — || align=right data-sort-value="0.92" | 920 m || 
|-id=224 bgcolor=#E9E9E9
| 228224 ||  || — || February 23, 1998 || Kitt Peak || Spacewatch || — || align=right | 2.0 km || 
|-id=225 bgcolor=#E9E9E9
| 228225 ||  || — || April 24, 1998 || Kitt Peak || Spacewatch || HEN || align=right | 1.5 km || 
|-id=226 bgcolor=#E9E9E9
| 228226 ||  || — || April 18, 1998 || Socorro || LINEAR || — || align=right | 2.1 km || 
|-id=227 bgcolor=#E9E9E9
| 228227 ||  || — || April 18, 1998 || Kitt Peak || Spacewatch || — || align=right | 3.3 km || 
|-id=228 bgcolor=#E9E9E9
| 228228 ||  || — || April 21, 1998 || Socorro || LINEAR || — || align=right | 2.0 km || 
|-id=229 bgcolor=#E9E9E9
| 228229 ||  || — || June 27, 1998 || Mauna Kea || K. J. Meech || — || align=right | 2.1 km || 
|-id=230 bgcolor=#fefefe
| 228230 ||  || — || August 24, 1998 || Socorro || LINEAR || V || align=right | 1.2 km || 
|-id=231 bgcolor=#FA8072
| 228231 ||  || — || August 26, 1998 || La Silla || E. W. Elst || — || align=right data-sort-value="0.94" | 940 m || 
|-id=232 bgcolor=#d6d6d6
| 228232 ||  || — || September 13, 1998 || Kitt Peak || Spacewatch || — || align=right | 3.0 km || 
|-id=233 bgcolor=#d6d6d6
| 228233 ||  || — || September 14, 1998 || Kitt Peak || Spacewatch || — || align=right | 2.9 km || 
|-id=234 bgcolor=#fefefe
| 228234 ||  || — || September 20, 1998 || Kitt Peak || Spacewatch || — || align=right data-sort-value="0.98" | 980 m || 
|-id=235 bgcolor=#fefefe
| 228235 ||  || — || September 19, 1998 || Socorro || LINEAR || — || align=right | 1.4 km || 
|-id=236 bgcolor=#d6d6d6
| 228236 ||  || — || September 26, 1998 || Socorro || LINEAR || — || align=right | 3.5 km || 
|-id=237 bgcolor=#fefefe
| 228237 ||  || — || September 25, 1998 || Anderson Mesa || LONEOS || — || align=right | 1.3 km || 
|-id=238 bgcolor=#fefefe
| 228238 ||  || — || September 19, 1998 || Anderson Mesa || LONEOS || V || align=right | 1.0 km || 
|-id=239 bgcolor=#C2FFFF
| 228239 ||  || — || October 13, 1998 || Kitt Peak || Spacewatch || L4 || align=right | 12 km || 
|-id=240 bgcolor=#d6d6d6
| 228240 ||  || — || October 14, 1998 || Kitt Peak || Spacewatch || — || align=right | 2.2 km || 
|-id=241 bgcolor=#fefefe
| 228241 ||  || — || October 17, 1998 || Kitt Peak || Spacewatch || NYS || align=right data-sort-value="0.70" | 700 m || 
|-id=242 bgcolor=#fefefe
| 228242 ||  || — || October 18, 1998 || Xinglong || SCAP || — || align=right | 1.4 km || 
|-id=243 bgcolor=#fefefe
| 228243 ||  || — || October 18, 1998 || Xinglong || SCAP || — || align=right | 1.1 km || 
|-id=244 bgcolor=#fefefe
| 228244 ||  || — || October 28, 1998 || Socorro || LINEAR || — || align=right | 2.1 km || 
|-id=245 bgcolor=#fefefe
| 228245 ||  || — || November 15, 1998 || Kitt Peak || Spacewatch || V || align=right data-sort-value="0.86" | 860 m || 
|-id=246 bgcolor=#d6d6d6
| 228246 ||  || — || November 22, 1998 || Kitt Peak || Spacewatch || — || align=right | 6.1 km || 
|-id=247 bgcolor=#d6d6d6
| 228247 ||  || — || December 8, 1998 || Caussols || ODAS || EMA || align=right | 5.4 km || 
|-id=248 bgcolor=#d6d6d6
| 228248 ||  || — || December 15, 1998 || Caussols || ODAS || — || align=right | 4.4 km || 
|-id=249 bgcolor=#d6d6d6
| 228249 ||  || — || December 14, 1998 || Socorro || LINEAR || — || align=right | 5.5 km || 
|-id=250 bgcolor=#d6d6d6
| 228250 ||  || — || December 25, 1998 || Kitt Peak || Spacewatch || THM || align=right | 3.0 km || 
|-id=251 bgcolor=#fefefe
| 228251 ||  || — || January 7, 1999 || Kitt Peak || Spacewatch || — || align=right | 1.1 km || 
|-id=252 bgcolor=#fefefe
| 228252 ||  || — || January 15, 1999 || Kitt Peak || Spacewatch || — || align=right | 1.5 km || 
|-id=253 bgcolor=#fefefe
| 228253 ||  || — || February 9, 1999 || Kitt Peak || Spacewatch || NYS || align=right data-sort-value="0.76" | 760 m || 
|-id=254 bgcolor=#fefefe
| 228254 ||  || — || February 10, 1999 || Kitt Peak || Spacewatch || — || align=right | 1.2 km || 
|-id=255 bgcolor=#d6d6d6
| 228255 ||  || — || March 12, 1999 || Kitt Peak || Spacewatch || THM || align=right | 3.0 km || 
|-id=256 bgcolor=#fefefe
| 228256 ||  || — || March 15, 1999 || Socorro || LINEAR || — || align=right | 1.5 km || 
|-id=257 bgcolor=#E9E9E9
| 228257 ||  || — || May 13, 1999 || Socorro || LINEAR || — || align=right | 1.4 km || 
|-id=258 bgcolor=#E9E9E9
| 228258 ||  || — || July 12, 1999 || Socorro || LINEAR || — || align=right | 4.6 km || 
|-id=259 bgcolor=#E9E9E9
| 228259 ||  || — || August 12, 1999 || Eskridge || G. Hug || — || align=right | 3.5 km || 
|-id=260 bgcolor=#E9E9E9
| 228260 ||  || — || September 7, 1999 || Socorro || LINEAR || DOR || align=right | 3.9 km || 
|-id=261 bgcolor=#fefefe
| 228261 ||  || — || September 7, 1999 || Socorro || LINEAR || — || align=right data-sort-value="0.93" | 930 m || 
|-id=262 bgcolor=#E9E9E9
| 228262 ||  || — || October 8, 1999 || Kitt Peak || Spacewatch || — || align=right | 3.2 km || 
|-id=263 bgcolor=#fefefe
| 228263 ||  || — || October 4, 1999 || Socorro || LINEAR || — || align=right | 1.3 km || 
|-id=264 bgcolor=#fefefe
| 228264 ||  || — || October 6, 1999 || Socorro || LINEAR || — || align=right | 1.1 km || 
|-id=265 bgcolor=#fefefe
| 228265 ||  || — || October 10, 1999 || Socorro || LINEAR || — || align=right data-sort-value="0.97" | 970 m || 
|-id=266 bgcolor=#fefefe
| 228266 ||  || — || October 12, 1999 || Socorro || LINEAR || — || align=right | 1.2 km || 
|-id=267 bgcolor=#FA8072
| 228267 ||  || — || October 12, 1999 || Socorro || LINEAR || — || align=right | 1.6 km || 
|-id=268 bgcolor=#d6d6d6
| 228268 ||  || — || October 1, 1999 || Catalina || CSS || — || align=right | 4.1 km || 
|-id=269 bgcolor=#E9E9E9
| 228269 ||  || — || October 3, 1999 || Socorro || LINEAR || GEF || align=right | 1.9 km || 
|-id=270 bgcolor=#fefefe
| 228270 ||  || — || October 12, 1999 || Kitt Peak || Spacewatch || — || align=right | 1.1 km || 
|-id=271 bgcolor=#E9E9E9
| 228271 ||  || — || October 3, 1999 || Socorro || LINEAR || — || align=right | 4.0 km || 
|-id=272 bgcolor=#E9E9E9
| 228272 ||  || — || October 6, 1999 || Socorro || LINEAR || HNA || align=right | 2.2 km || 
|-id=273 bgcolor=#d6d6d6
| 228273 ||  || — || October 30, 1999 || Kitt Peak || Spacewatch || BRA || align=right | 1.9 km || 
|-id=274 bgcolor=#E9E9E9
| 228274 ||  || — || October 29, 1999 || Catalina || CSS || — || align=right | 3.1 km || 
|-id=275 bgcolor=#d6d6d6
| 228275 ||  || — || November 4, 1999 || Socorro || LINEAR || EOS || align=right | 3.0 km || 
|-id=276 bgcolor=#d6d6d6
| 228276 ||  || — || November 4, 1999 || Socorro || LINEAR || — || align=right | 4.7 km || 
|-id=277 bgcolor=#d6d6d6
| 228277 ||  || — || November 9, 1999 || Socorro || LINEAR || — || align=right | 4.0 km || 
|-id=278 bgcolor=#fefefe
| 228278 ||  || — || November 30, 1999 || Kitt Peak || Spacewatch || FLO || align=right data-sort-value="0.89" | 890 m || 
|-id=279 bgcolor=#d6d6d6
| 228279 ||  || — || November 30, 1999 || Kitt Peak || Spacewatch || — || align=right | 3.3 km || 
|-id=280 bgcolor=#d6d6d6
| 228280 ||  || — || December 7, 1999 || Socorro || LINEAR || TRP || align=right | 4.0 km || 
|-id=281 bgcolor=#fefefe
| 228281 ||  || — || December 5, 1999 || Catalina || CSS || — || align=right | 1.1 km || 
|-id=282 bgcolor=#d6d6d6
| 228282 ||  || — || December 8, 1999 || Kitt Peak || Spacewatch || 628 || align=right | 2.9 km || 
|-id=283 bgcolor=#FA8072
| 228283 ||  || — || January 4, 2000 || Socorro || LINEAR || — || align=right | 1.1 km || 
|-id=284 bgcolor=#d6d6d6
| 228284 ||  || — || January 7, 2000 || Socorro || LINEAR || SAN || align=right | 2.6 km || 
|-id=285 bgcolor=#fefefe
| 228285 ||  || — || January 7, 2000 || Socorro || LINEAR || — || align=right | 1.8 km || 
|-id=286 bgcolor=#d6d6d6
| 228286 ||  || — || January 27, 2000 || Kitt Peak || Spacewatch || — || align=right | 2.5 km || 
|-id=287 bgcolor=#d6d6d6
| 228287 ||  || — || January 26, 2000 || Višnjan Observatory || K. Korlević || — || align=right | 5.6 km || 
|-id=288 bgcolor=#d6d6d6
| 228288 ||  || — || January 30, 2000 || Catalina || CSS || — || align=right | 4.2 km || 
|-id=289 bgcolor=#fefefe
| 228289 ||  || — || January 30, 2000 || Catalina || CSS || — || align=right | 1.1 km || 
|-id=290 bgcolor=#C2FFFF
| 228290 ||  || — || February 1, 2000 || Kitt Peak || Spacewatch || L4 || align=right | 7.8 km || 
|-id=291 bgcolor=#fefefe
| 228291 ||  || — || February 10, 2000 || Kitt Peak || Spacewatch || — || align=right data-sort-value="0.98" | 980 m || 
|-id=292 bgcolor=#d6d6d6
| 228292 ||  || — || February 26, 2000 || Kitt Peak || Spacewatch || — || align=right | 3.8 km || 
|-id=293 bgcolor=#d6d6d6
| 228293 ||  || — || February 28, 2000 || Kitt Peak || Spacewatch || — || align=right | 3.8 km || 
|-id=294 bgcolor=#fefefe
| 228294 ||  || — || February 29, 2000 || Socorro || LINEAR || — || align=right | 1.2 km || 
|-id=295 bgcolor=#fefefe
| 228295 ||  || — || February 29, 2000 || Socorro || LINEAR || MAS || align=right data-sort-value="0.92" | 920 m || 
|-id=296 bgcolor=#fefefe
| 228296 ||  || — || February 28, 2000 || Socorro || LINEAR || — || align=right | 1.2 km || 
|-id=297 bgcolor=#fefefe
| 228297 ||  || — || February 29, 2000 || Socorro || LINEAR || — || align=right | 1.2 km || 
|-id=298 bgcolor=#fefefe
| 228298 ||  || — || March 2, 2000 || Kitt Peak || Spacewatch || — || align=right data-sort-value="0.90" | 900 m || 
|-id=299 bgcolor=#fefefe
| 228299 ||  || — || March 8, 2000 || Kitt Peak || Spacewatch || NYS || align=right data-sort-value="0.77" | 770 m || 
|-id=300 bgcolor=#d6d6d6
| 228300 ||  || — || March 3, 2000 || Kitt Peak || Spacewatch || — || align=right | 4.7 km || 
|}

228301–228400 

|-bgcolor=#d6d6d6
| 228301 ||  || — || March 9, 2000 || Kitt Peak || Spacewatch || — || align=right | 3.5 km || 
|-id=302 bgcolor=#d6d6d6
| 228302 ||  || — || March 8, 2000 || Socorro || LINEAR || — || align=right | 3.3 km || 
|-id=303 bgcolor=#fefefe
| 228303 ||  || — || April 5, 2000 || Socorro || LINEAR || — || align=right | 1.3 km || 
|-id=304 bgcolor=#d6d6d6
| 228304 ||  || — || April 5, 2000 || Socorro || LINEAR || — || align=right | 3.3 km || 
|-id=305 bgcolor=#E9E9E9
| 228305 ||  || — || April 5, 2000 || Kitt Peak || Spacewatch || — || align=right | 1.9 km || 
|-id=306 bgcolor=#d6d6d6
| 228306 ||  || — || April 28, 2000 || Anderson Mesa || LONEOS || — || align=right | 5.2 km || 
|-id=307 bgcolor=#fefefe
| 228307 ||  || — || April 29, 2000 || Kitt Peak || Spacewatch || — || align=right | 1.1 km || 
|-id=308 bgcolor=#fefefe
| 228308 ||  || — || April 27, 2000 || Kitt Peak || Spacewatch || NYS || align=right data-sort-value="0.88" | 880 m || 
|-id=309 bgcolor=#fefefe
| 228309 ||  || — || May 7, 2000 || Socorro || LINEAR || — || align=right | 1.4 km || 
|-id=310 bgcolor=#fefefe
| 228310 ||  || — || May 7, 2000 || Socorro || LINEAR || — || align=right | 1.4 km || 
|-id=311 bgcolor=#fefefe
| 228311 ||  || — || June 6, 2000 || Anderson Mesa || LONEOS || — || align=right | 1.6 km || 
|-id=312 bgcolor=#fefefe
| 228312 ||  || — || July 23, 2000 || Socorro || LINEAR || H || align=right | 1.1 km || 
|-id=313 bgcolor=#E9E9E9
| 228313 ||  || — || July 24, 2000 || Socorro || LINEAR || — || align=right | 1.9 km || 
|-id=314 bgcolor=#E9E9E9
| 228314 ||  || — || July 30, 2000 || Socorro || LINEAR || — || align=right | 2.2 km || 
|-id=315 bgcolor=#E9E9E9
| 228315 ||  || — || August 25, 2000 || Socorro || LINEAR || — || align=right | 1.3 km || 
|-id=316 bgcolor=#E9E9E9
| 228316 ||  || — || August 26, 2000 || Socorro || LINEAR || — || align=right | 1.8 km || 
|-id=317 bgcolor=#E9E9E9
| 228317 ||  || — || August 26, 2000 || Socorro || LINEAR || — || align=right | 1.6 km || 
|-id=318 bgcolor=#d6d6d6
| 228318 ||  || — || August 24, 2000 || Socorro || LINEAR || THB || align=right | 5.3 km || 
|-id=319 bgcolor=#E9E9E9
| 228319 ||  || — || August 28, 2000 || Socorro || LINEAR || — || align=right | 2.5 km || 
|-id=320 bgcolor=#E9E9E9
| 228320 ||  || — || August 28, 2000 || Socorro || LINEAR || — || align=right | 2.2 km || 
|-id=321 bgcolor=#E9E9E9
| 228321 ||  || — || August 31, 2000 || Prescott || P. G. Comba || — || align=right | 1.1 km || 
|-id=322 bgcolor=#E9E9E9
| 228322 ||  || — || August 29, 2000 || Socorro || LINEAR || — || align=right | 2.5 km || 
|-id=323 bgcolor=#E9E9E9
| 228323 ||  || — || August 31, 2000 || Socorro || LINEAR || — || align=right | 2.2 km || 
|-id=324 bgcolor=#E9E9E9
| 228324 ||  || — || August 31, 2000 || Socorro || LINEAR || — || align=right | 1.1 km || 
|-id=325 bgcolor=#E9E9E9
| 228325 ||  || — || August 26, 2000 || Haleakala || NEAT || EUN || align=right | 2.2 km || 
|-id=326 bgcolor=#E9E9E9
| 228326 ||  || — || August 20, 2000 || Kitt Peak || Spacewatch || — || align=right | 1.5 km || 
|-id=327 bgcolor=#E9E9E9
| 228327 ||  || — || September 1, 2000 || Socorro || LINEAR || — || align=right | 2.7 km || 
|-id=328 bgcolor=#E9E9E9
| 228328 ||  || — || September 1, 2000 || Socorro || LINEAR || slow || align=right | 3.2 km || 
|-id=329 bgcolor=#E9E9E9
| 228329 ||  || — || September 1, 2000 || Socorro || LINEAR || — || align=right | 1.7 km || 
|-id=330 bgcolor=#E9E9E9
| 228330 ||  || — || September 1, 2000 || Socorro || LINEAR || — || align=right | 2.5 km || 
|-id=331 bgcolor=#E9E9E9
| 228331 ||  || — || September 2, 2000 || Socorro || LINEAR || — || align=right | 2.4 km || 
|-id=332 bgcolor=#E9E9E9
| 228332 ||  || — || September 5, 2000 || Anderson Mesa || LONEOS || IAN || align=right | 1.5 km || 
|-id=333 bgcolor=#E9E9E9
| 228333 ||  || — || September 23, 2000 || Socorro || LINEAR || — || align=right | 2.2 km || 
|-id=334 bgcolor=#E9E9E9
| 228334 ||  || — || September 23, 2000 || Socorro || LINEAR || EUN || align=right | 2.0 km || 
|-id=335 bgcolor=#E9E9E9
| 228335 ||  || — || September 24, 2000 || Socorro || LINEAR || MAR || align=right | 1.7 km || 
|-id=336 bgcolor=#E9E9E9
| 228336 ||  || — || September 24, 2000 || Socorro || LINEAR || — || align=right | 2.1 km || 
|-id=337 bgcolor=#E9E9E9
| 228337 ||  || — || September 24, 2000 || Socorro || LINEAR || — || align=right | 3.0 km || 
|-id=338 bgcolor=#E9E9E9
| 228338 ||  || — || September 23, 2000 || Socorro || LINEAR || — || align=right | 2.2 km || 
|-id=339 bgcolor=#E9E9E9
| 228339 ||  || — || September 23, 2000 || Socorro || LINEAR || — || align=right | 2.5 km || 
|-id=340 bgcolor=#E9E9E9
| 228340 ||  || — || September 22, 2000 || Socorro || LINEAR || — || align=right | 1.5 km || 
|-id=341 bgcolor=#E9E9E9
| 228341 ||  || — || September 23, 2000 || Socorro || LINEAR || — || align=right | 2.7 km || 
|-id=342 bgcolor=#E9E9E9
| 228342 ||  || — || September 23, 2000 || Socorro || LINEAR || BRG || align=right | 2.2 km || 
|-id=343 bgcolor=#E9E9E9
| 228343 ||  || — || September 23, 2000 || Socorro || LINEAR || — || align=right | 3.3 km || 
|-id=344 bgcolor=#E9E9E9
| 228344 ||  || — || September 24, 2000 || Socorro || LINEAR || — || align=right | 1.7 km || 
|-id=345 bgcolor=#E9E9E9
| 228345 ||  || — || September 28, 2000 || Socorro || LINEAR || EUN || align=right | 1.9 km || 
|-id=346 bgcolor=#E9E9E9
| 228346 ||  || — || September 20, 2000 || Haleakala || NEAT || — || align=right | 1.7 km || 
|-id=347 bgcolor=#E9E9E9
| 228347 ||  || — || September 24, 2000 || Socorro || LINEAR || — || align=right | 1.5 km || 
|-id=348 bgcolor=#E9E9E9
| 228348 ||  || — || September 27, 2000 || Socorro || LINEAR || — || align=right | 2.3 km || 
|-id=349 bgcolor=#E9E9E9
| 228349 ||  || — || September 30, 2000 || Socorro || LINEAR || — || align=right | 2.6 km || 
|-id=350 bgcolor=#E9E9E9
| 228350 ||  || — || September 23, 2000 || Socorro || LINEAR || — || align=right | 2.5 km || 
|-id=351 bgcolor=#E9E9E9
| 228351 ||  || — || September 27, 2000 || Socorro || LINEAR || — || align=right | 1.1 km || 
|-id=352 bgcolor=#E9E9E9
| 228352 ||  || — || September 28, 2000 || Socorro || LINEAR || — || align=right | 2.6 km || 
|-id=353 bgcolor=#E9E9E9
| 228353 ||  || — || September 30, 2000 || Socorro || LINEAR || JNS || align=right | 3.5 km || 
|-id=354 bgcolor=#E9E9E9
| 228354 ||  || — || September 28, 2000 || Socorro || LINEAR || — || align=right | 2.8 km || 
|-id=355 bgcolor=#E9E9E9
| 228355 ||  || — || September 30, 2000 || Socorro || LINEAR || — || align=right | 3.7 km || 
|-id=356 bgcolor=#E9E9E9
| 228356 ||  || — || October 1, 2000 || Socorro || LINEAR || — || align=right | 1.4 km || 
|-id=357 bgcolor=#E9E9E9
| 228357 ||  || — || October 3, 2000 || Socorro || LINEAR || — || align=right | 2.9 km || 
|-id=358 bgcolor=#E9E9E9
| 228358 ||  || — || October 1, 2000 || Socorro || LINEAR || — || align=right | 1.6 km || 
|-id=359 bgcolor=#E9E9E9
| 228359 ||  || — || October 2, 2000 || Socorro || LINEAR || — || align=right | 1.7 km || 
|-id=360 bgcolor=#E9E9E9
| 228360 ||  || — || October 23, 2000 || Črni Vrh || Črni Vrh || — || align=right | 3.0 km || 
|-id=361 bgcolor=#E9E9E9
| 228361 ||  || — || October 24, 2000 || Socorro || LINEAR || — || align=right | 1.9 km || 
|-id=362 bgcolor=#E9E9E9
| 228362 ||  || — || October 25, 2000 || Socorro || LINEAR || — || align=right | 3.8 km || 
|-id=363 bgcolor=#E9E9E9
| 228363 ||  || — || October 31, 2000 || Socorro || LINEAR || — || align=right | 2.9 km || 
|-id=364 bgcolor=#E9E9E9
| 228364 ||  || — || November 1, 2000 || Socorro || LINEAR || — || align=right | 2.2 km || 
|-id=365 bgcolor=#E9E9E9
| 228365 ||  || — || November 3, 2000 || Socorro || LINEAR || — || align=right | 3.4 km || 
|-id=366 bgcolor=#E9E9E9
| 228366 ||  || — || November 2, 2000 || Socorro || LINEAR || — || align=right | 1.9 km || 
|-id=367 bgcolor=#E9E9E9
| 228367 ||  || — || November 1, 2000 || Socorro || LINEAR || MIS || align=right | 2.7 km || 
|-id=368 bgcolor=#FFC2E0
| 228368 ||  || — || November 19, 2000 || Socorro || LINEAR || APOPHA || align=right data-sort-value="0.70" | 700 m || 
|-id=369 bgcolor=#E9E9E9
| 228369 ||  || — || November 22, 2000 || Haleakala || NEAT || — || align=right | 2.8 km || 
|-id=370 bgcolor=#E9E9E9
| 228370 ||  || — || November 23, 2000 || Kitt Peak || Spacewatch || GEF || align=right | 2.1 km || 
|-id=371 bgcolor=#E9E9E9
| 228371 ||  || — || November 21, 2000 || Socorro || LINEAR || — || align=right | 2.3 km || 
|-id=372 bgcolor=#E9E9E9
| 228372 ||  || — || November 27, 2000 || Kitt Peak || Spacewatch || — || align=right | 3.0 km || 
|-id=373 bgcolor=#E9E9E9
| 228373 ||  || — || November 23, 2000 || Haleakala || NEAT || — || align=right | 2.9 km || 
|-id=374 bgcolor=#E9E9E9
| 228374 ||  || — || November 21, 2000 || Socorro || LINEAR || GER || align=right | 3.1 km || 
|-id=375 bgcolor=#E9E9E9
| 228375 ||  || — || November 19, 2000 || Socorro || LINEAR || — || align=right | 2.4 km || 
|-id=376 bgcolor=#E9E9E9
| 228376 ||  || — || November 19, 2000 || Socorro || LINEAR || — || align=right | 3.2 km || 
|-id=377 bgcolor=#E9E9E9
| 228377 ||  || — || November 19, 2000 || Socorro || LINEAR || — || align=right | 3.3 km || 
|-id=378 bgcolor=#E9E9E9
| 228378 ||  || — || November 19, 2000 || Socorro || LINEAR || HNS || align=right | 2.8 km || 
|-id=379 bgcolor=#E9E9E9
| 228379 ||  || — || November 20, 2000 || Socorro || LINEAR || — || align=right | 2.0 km || 
|-id=380 bgcolor=#E9E9E9
| 228380 ||  || — || November 20, 2000 || Socorro || LINEAR || — || align=right | 1.8 km || 
|-id=381 bgcolor=#E9E9E9
| 228381 ||  || — || November 19, 2000 || Socorro || LINEAR || — || align=right | 2.9 km || 
|-id=382 bgcolor=#E9E9E9
| 228382 ||  || — || November 29, 2000 || Haleakala || NEAT || ADE || align=right | 3.8 km || 
|-id=383 bgcolor=#E9E9E9
| 228383 ||  || — || November 16, 2000 || Anderson Mesa || LONEOS || — || align=right | 3.0 km || 
|-id=384 bgcolor=#E9E9E9
| 228384 ||  || — || December 4, 2000 || Bohyunsan || Y.-B. Jeon, B.-C. Lee || HEN || align=right | 1.5 km || 
|-id=385 bgcolor=#E9E9E9
| 228385 ||  || — || December 4, 2000 || Socorro || LINEAR || — || align=right | 2.4 km || 
|-id=386 bgcolor=#E9E9E9
| 228386 ||  || — || December 22, 2000 || Haleakala || NEAT || — || align=right | 2.0 km || 
|-id=387 bgcolor=#E9E9E9
| 228387 ||  || — || December 30, 2000 || Socorro || LINEAR || — || align=right | 5.2 km || 
|-id=388 bgcolor=#E9E9E9
| 228388 ||  || — || December 30, 2000 || Socorro || LINEAR || — || align=right | 3.5 km || 
|-id=389 bgcolor=#E9E9E9
| 228389 ||  || — || December 30, 2000 || Socorro || LINEAR || — || align=right | 1.7 km || 
|-id=390 bgcolor=#E9E9E9
| 228390 ||  || — || December 30, 2000 || Socorro || LINEAR || GEF || align=right | 2.7 km || 
|-id=391 bgcolor=#E9E9E9
| 228391 ||  || — || December 29, 2000 || Haleakala || NEAT || — || align=right | 3.4 km || 
|-id=392 bgcolor=#E9E9E9
| 228392 ||  || — || January 5, 2001 || Socorro || LINEAR || — || align=right | 2.5 km || 
|-id=393 bgcolor=#E9E9E9
| 228393 ||  || — || January 15, 2001 || Socorro || LINEAR || — || align=right | 3.0 km || 
|-id=394 bgcolor=#E9E9E9
| 228394 ||  || — || January 19, 2001 || Socorro || LINEAR || — || align=right | 2.9 km || 
|-id=395 bgcolor=#E9E9E9
| 228395 ||  || — || January 20, 2001 || Socorro || LINEAR || — || align=right | 2.2 km || 
|-id=396 bgcolor=#E9E9E9
| 228396 ||  || — || January 20, 2001 || Socorro || LINEAR || — || align=right | 1.7 km || 
|-id=397 bgcolor=#E9E9E9
| 228397 ||  || — || February 1, 2001 || Anderson Mesa || LONEOS || — || align=right | 2.4 km || 
|-id=398 bgcolor=#E9E9E9
| 228398 ||  || — || February 1, 2001 || Anderson Mesa || LONEOS || — || align=right | 1.9 km || 
|-id=399 bgcolor=#E9E9E9
| 228399 ||  || — || February 15, 2001 || La Palma || La Palma Obs. || — || align=right | 2.8 km || 
|-id=400 bgcolor=#d6d6d6
| 228400 ||  || — || February 20, 2001 || Socorro || LINEAR || — || align=right | 4.2 km || 
|}

228401–228500 

|-bgcolor=#d6d6d6
| 228401 ||  || — || February 22, 2001 || Nogales || Tenagra II Obs. || — || align=right | 3.8 km || 
|-id=402 bgcolor=#E9E9E9
| 228402 ||  || — || March 1, 2001 || Socorro || LINEAR || CLO || align=right | 3.4 km || 
|-id=403 bgcolor=#d6d6d6
| 228403 ||  || — || March 3, 2001 || Kitt Peak || Spacewatch || — || align=right | 5.3 km || 
|-id=404 bgcolor=#FA8072
| 228404 ||  || — || March 15, 2001 || Socorro || LINEAR || — || align=right | 1.4 km || 
|-id=405 bgcolor=#d6d6d6
| 228405 ||  || — || March 18, 2001 || Socorro || LINEAR || — || align=right | 4.3 km || 
|-id=406 bgcolor=#d6d6d6
| 228406 ||  || — || March 21, 2001 || Haleakala || NEAT || KOR || align=right | 2.0 km || 
|-id=407 bgcolor=#d6d6d6
| 228407 ||  || — || March 24, 2001 || Anderson Mesa || LONEOS || EOS || align=right | 3.3 km || 
|-id=408 bgcolor=#fefefe
| 228408 ||  || — || March 27, 2001 || Anderson Mesa || LONEOS || — || align=right | 2.8 km || 
|-id=409 bgcolor=#d6d6d6
| 228409 ||  || — || March 26, 2001 || Kitt Peak || M. W. Buie || — || align=right | 5.0 km || 
|-id=410 bgcolor=#fefefe
| 228410 ||  || — || April 25, 2001 || Haleakala || NEAT || FLO || align=right | 1.0 km || 
|-id=411 bgcolor=#d6d6d6
| 228411 ||  || — || May 18, 2001 || Haleakala || NEAT || HYG || align=right | 3.8 km || 
|-id=412 bgcolor=#E9E9E9
| 228412 ||  || — || May 29, 2001 || Socorro || LINEAR || — || align=right | 2.2 km || 
|-id=413 bgcolor=#fefefe
| 228413 ||  || — || June 14, 2001 || Palomar || NEAT || — || align=right | 3.4 km || 
|-id=414 bgcolor=#fefefe
| 228414 ||  || — || June 28, 2001 || Palomar || NEAT || NYS || align=right data-sort-value="0.72" | 720 m || 
|-id=415 bgcolor=#d6d6d6
| 228415 ||  || — || July 13, 2001 || Palomar || NEAT || — || align=right | 5.0 km || 
|-id=416 bgcolor=#fefefe
| 228416 ||  || — || July 16, 2001 || Anderson Mesa || LONEOS || — || align=right | 2.7 km || 
|-id=417 bgcolor=#fefefe
| 228417 ||  || — || July 21, 2001 || Haleakala || NEAT || — || align=right | 3.8 km || 
|-id=418 bgcolor=#fefefe
| 228418 ||  || — || July 23, 2001 || Haleakala || NEAT || — || align=right | 1.6 km || 
|-id=419 bgcolor=#fefefe
| 228419 ||  || — || July 22, 2001 || Socorro || LINEAR || — || align=right | 2.6 km || 
|-id=420 bgcolor=#fefefe
| 228420 ||  || — || July 29, 2001 || Palomar || NEAT || NYS || align=right | 1.1 km || 
|-id=421 bgcolor=#fefefe
| 228421 ||  || — || July 25, 2001 || Haleakala || NEAT || — || align=right | 1.7 km || 
|-id=422 bgcolor=#d6d6d6
| 228422 ||  || — || July 27, 2001 || Anderson Mesa || LONEOS || MEL || align=right | 7.1 km || 
|-id=423 bgcolor=#fefefe
| 228423 ||  || — || August 10, 2001 || Palomar || NEAT || — || align=right | 1.4 km || 
|-id=424 bgcolor=#fefefe
| 228424 ||  || — || August 10, 2001 || Haleakala || NEAT || NYS || align=right data-sort-value="0.93" | 930 m || 
|-id=425 bgcolor=#fefefe
| 228425 ||  || — || August 15, 2001 || Reedy Creek || J. Broughton || — || align=right | 1.3 km || 
|-id=426 bgcolor=#fefefe
| 228426 ||  || — || August 10, 2001 || Palomar || NEAT || — || align=right | 1.3 km || 
|-id=427 bgcolor=#fefefe
| 228427 ||  || — || August 13, 2001 || Palomar || NEAT || PHO || align=right | 1.9 km || 
|-id=428 bgcolor=#fefefe
| 228428 ||  || — || August 15, 2001 || Haleakala || NEAT || — || align=right | 1.2 km || 
|-id=429 bgcolor=#fefefe
| 228429 ||  || — || August 14, 2001 || Haleakala || NEAT || — || align=right data-sort-value="0.89" | 890 m || 
|-id=430 bgcolor=#fefefe
| 228430 ||  || — || August 13, 2001 || Haleakala || NEAT || V || align=right | 1.2 km || 
|-id=431 bgcolor=#fefefe
| 228431 || 2001 QZ || — || August 16, 2001 || Socorro || LINEAR || NYS || align=right data-sort-value="0.83" | 830 m || 
|-id=432 bgcolor=#fefefe
| 228432 ||  || — || August 16, 2001 || Socorro || LINEAR || NYS || align=right data-sort-value="0.97" | 970 m || 
|-id=433 bgcolor=#fefefe
| 228433 ||  || — || August 16, 2001 || Socorro || LINEAR || NYS || align=right data-sort-value="0.84" | 840 m || 
|-id=434 bgcolor=#fefefe
| 228434 ||  || — || August 16, 2001 || Socorro || LINEAR || NYS || align=right data-sort-value="0.72" | 720 m || 
|-id=435 bgcolor=#fefefe
| 228435 ||  || — || August 18, 2001 || Socorro || LINEAR || — || align=right | 1.5 km || 
|-id=436 bgcolor=#FA8072
| 228436 ||  || — || August 16, 2001 || Palomar || NEAT || H || align=right data-sort-value="0.75" | 750 m || 
|-id=437 bgcolor=#fefefe
| 228437 ||  || — || August 17, 2001 || Palomar || NEAT || — || align=right | 1.4 km || 
|-id=438 bgcolor=#fefefe
| 228438 ||  || — || August 21, 2001 || Socorro || LINEAR || V || align=right | 1.1 km || 
|-id=439 bgcolor=#E9E9E9
| 228439 ||  || — || August 20, 2001 || Palomar || NEAT || MAR || align=right | 1.4 km || 
|-id=440 bgcolor=#fefefe
| 228440 ||  || — || August 22, 2001 || Haleakala || NEAT || NYS || align=right | 2.4 km || 
|-id=441 bgcolor=#fefefe
| 228441 ||  || — || August 23, 2001 || Anderson Mesa || LONEOS || NYS || align=right | 1.0 km || 
|-id=442 bgcolor=#fefefe
| 228442 ||  || — || August 23, 2001 || Anderson Mesa || LONEOS || MAS || align=right | 1.0 km || 
|-id=443 bgcolor=#fefefe
| 228443 ||  || — || August 23, 2001 || Anderson Mesa || LONEOS || MAS || align=right data-sort-value="0.97" | 970 m || 
|-id=444 bgcolor=#fefefe
| 228444 ||  || — || August 24, 2001 || Haleakala || NEAT || — || align=right | 1.1 km || 
|-id=445 bgcolor=#fefefe
| 228445 ||  || — || August 24, 2001 || Haleakala || NEAT || V || align=right data-sort-value="0.83" | 830 m || 
|-id=446 bgcolor=#fefefe
| 228446 ||  || — || August 24, 2001 || Haleakala || NEAT || MAS || align=right | 1.1 km || 
|-id=447 bgcolor=#fefefe
| 228447 ||  || — || August 25, 2001 || Socorro || LINEAR || V || align=right | 1.2 km || 
|-id=448 bgcolor=#fefefe
| 228448 ||  || — || August 26, 2001 || Socorro || LINEAR || — || align=right | 2.3 km || 
|-id=449 bgcolor=#fefefe
| 228449 ||  || — || August 28, 2001 || Palomar || NEAT || — || align=right | 1.6 km || 
|-id=450 bgcolor=#fefefe
| 228450 ||  || — || August 22, 2001 || Haleakala || NEAT || NYS || align=right data-sort-value="0.79" | 790 m || 
|-id=451 bgcolor=#fefefe
| 228451 ||  || — || August 23, 2001 || Desert Eagle || W. K. Y. Yeung || — || align=right | 3.0 km || 
|-id=452 bgcolor=#fefefe
| 228452 ||  || — || August 23, 2001 || Anderson Mesa || LONEOS || NYS || align=right data-sort-value="0.92" | 920 m || 
|-id=453 bgcolor=#fefefe
| 228453 ||  || — || August 23, 2001 || Anderson Mesa || LONEOS || — || align=right | 1.2 km || 
|-id=454 bgcolor=#fefefe
| 228454 ||  || — || August 24, 2001 || Socorro || LINEAR || — || align=right | 1.5 km || 
|-id=455 bgcolor=#fefefe
| 228455 ||  || — || August 25, 2001 || Socorro || LINEAR || — || align=right | 1.1 km || 
|-id=456 bgcolor=#fefefe
| 228456 ||  || — || August 25, 2001 || Socorro || LINEAR || — || align=right | 1.5 km || 
|-id=457 bgcolor=#fefefe
| 228457 ||  || — || August 19, 2001 || Socorro || LINEAR || — || align=right | 1.3 km || 
|-id=458 bgcolor=#fefefe
| 228458 ||  || — || August 19, 2001 || Socorro || LINEAR || FLO || align=right data-sort-value="0.98" | 980 m || 
|-id=459 bgcolor=#fefefe
| 228459 ||  || — || August 27, 2001 || Palomar || NEAT || V || align=right data-sort-value="0.99" | 990 m || 
|-id=460 bgcolor=#fefefe
| 228460 ||  || — || September 7, 2001 || Socorro || LINEAR || MAS || align=right | 1.0 km || 
|-id=461 bgcolor=#fefefe
| 228461 ||  || — || September 7, 2001 || Socorro || LINEAR || NYS || align=right | 1.1 km || 
|-id=462 bgcolor=#fefefe
| 228462 ||  || — || September 7, 2001 || Socorro || LINEAR || — || align=right | 1.0 km || 
|-id=463 bgcolor=#fefefe
| 228463 ||  || — || September 11, 2001 || Socorro || LINEAR || H || align=right | 1.1 km || 
|-id=464 bgcolor=#fefefe
| 228464 ||  || — || September 12, 2001 || Socorro || LINEAR || MAS || align=right data-sort-value="0.86" | 860 m || 
|-id=465 bgcolor=#fefefe
| 228465 ||  || — || September 12, 2001 || Socorro || LINEAR || — || align=right | 1.4 km || 
|-id=466 bgcolor=#fefefe
| 228466 ||  || — || September 11, 2001 || Anderson Mesa || LONEOS || — || align=right | 1.2 km || 
|-id=467 bgcolor=#fefefe
| 228467 ||  || — || September 11, 2001 || Anderson Mesa || LONEOS || NYS || align=right | 2.6 km || 
|-id=468 bgcolor=#fefefe
| 228468 ||  || — || September 12, 2001 || Socorro || LINEAR || NYS || align=right data-sort-value="0.78" | 780 m || 
|-id=469 bgcolor=#fefefe
| 228469 ||  || — || September 12, 2001 || Socorro || LINEAR || — || align=right | 1.2 km || 
|-id=470 bgcolor=#fefefe
| 228470 ||  || — || September 17, 2001 || Desert Eagle || W. K. Y. Yeung || NYS || align=right data-sort-value="0.89" | 890 m || 
|-id=471 bgcolor=#fefefe
| 228471 ||  || — || September 16, 2001 || Socorro || LINEAR || MAS || align=right | 1.1 km || 
|-id=472 bgcolor=#fefefe
| 228472 ||  || — || September 16, 2001 || Socorro || LINEAR || NYS || align=right data-sort-value="0.89" | 890 m || 
|-id=473 bgcolor=#fefefe
| 228473 ||  || — || September 16, 2001 || Socorro || LINEAR || NYS || align=right data-sort-value="0.98" | 980 m || 
|-id=474 bgcolor=#fefefe
| 228474 ||  || — || September 16, 2001 || Socorro || LINEAR || — || align=right | 1.1 km || 
|-id=475 bgcolor=#fefefe
| 228475 ||  || — || September 16, 2001 || Socorro || LINEAR || — || align=right | 1.2 km || 
|-id=476 bgcolor=#fefefe
| 228476 ||  || — || September 16, 2001 || Socorro || LINEAR || — || align=right | 1.3 km || 
|-id=477 bgcolor=#fefefe
| 228477 ||  || — || September 16, 2001 || Socorro || LINEAR || — || align=right | 1.3 km || 
|-id=478 bgcolor=#fefefe
| 228478 ||  || — || September 20, 2001 || Desert Eagle || W. K. Y. Yeung || — || align=right | 1.6 km || 
|-id=479 bgcolor=#fefefe
| 228479 ||  || — || September 19, 2001 || Anderson Mesa || LONEOS || V || align=right | 1.4 km || 
|-id=480 bgcolor=#E9E9E9
| 228480 ||  || — || September 16, 2001 || Socorro || LINEAR || — || align=right | 1.3 km || 
|-id=481 bgcolor=#fefefe
| 228481 ||  || — || September 19, 2001 || Socorro || LINEAR || — || align=right | 1.0 km || 
|-id=482 bgcolor=#fefefe
| 228482 ||  || — || September 20, 2001 || Socorro || LINEAR || MAS || align=right data-sort-value="0.98" | 980 m || 
|-id=483 bgcolor=#fefefe
| 228483 ||  || — || September 20, 2001 || Socorro || LINEAR || SUL || align=right | 4.2 km || 
|-id=484 bgcolor=#fefefe
| 228484 ||  || — || September 16, 2001 || Socorro || LINEAR || — || align=right | 1.5 km || 
|-id=485 bgcolor=#fefefe
| 228485 ||  || — || September 16, 2001 || Socorro || LINEAR || — || align=right | 1.1 km || 
|-id=486 bgcolor=#fefefe
| 228486 ||  || — || September 19, 2001 || Socorro || LINEAR || MAS || align=right data-sort-value="0.86" | 860 m || 
|-id=487 bgcolor=#fefefe
| 228487 ||  || — || September 16, 2001 || Socorro || LINEAR || NYS || align=right data-sort-value="0.77" | 770 m || 
|-id=488 bgcolor=#fefefe
| 228488 ||  || — || September 16, 2001 || Socorro || LINEAR || MAS || align=right | 1.1 km || 
|-id=489 bgcolor=#fefefe
| 228489 ||  || — || September 19, 2001 || Socorro || LINEAR || NYS || align=right | 1.0 km || 
|-id=490 bgcolor=#fefefe
| 228490 ||  || — || September 19, 2001 || Socorro || LINEAR || fast? || align=right data-sort-value="0.93" | 930 m || 
|-id=491 bgcolor=#fefefe
| 228491 ||  || — || September 19, 2001 || Socorro || LINEAR || MAS || align=right | 1.0 km || 
|-id=492 bgcolor=#fefefe
| 228492 ||  || — || September 19, 2001 || Socorro || LINEAR || — || align=right | 1.3 km || 
|-id=493 bgcolor=#fefefe
| 228493 ||  || — || September 19, 2001 || Socorro || LINEAR || — || align=right | 1.5 km || 
|-id=494 bgcolor=#fefefe
| 228494 ||  || — || September 19, 2001 || Socorro || LINEAR || V || align=right | 1.3 km || 
|-id=495 bgcolor=#E9E9E9
| 228495 ||  || — || September 25, 2001 || Desert Eagle || W. K. Y. Yeung || EUN || align=right | 1.4 km || 
|-id=496 bgcolor=#fefefe
| 228496 ||  || — || September 22, 2001 || Anderson Mesa || LONEOS || — || align=right | 1.7 km || 
|-id=497 bgcolor=#E9E9E9
| 228497 ||  || — || September 22, 2001 || Kitt Peak || Spacewatch || — || align=right | 1.3 km || 
|-id=498 bgcolor=#fefefe
| 228498 ||  || — || September 21, 2001 || Palomar || NEAT || — || align=right | 2.7 km || 
|-id=499 bgcolor=#E9E9E9
| 228499 ||  || — || September 28, 2001 || Palomar || NEAT || MAR || align=right | 1.4 km || 
|-id=500 bgcolor=#fefefe
| 228500 ||  || — || September 29, 2001 || Palomar || NEAT || V || align=right | 1.4 km || 
|}

228501–228600 

|-bgcolor=#fefefe
| 228501 ||  || — || September 26, 2001 || Socorro || LINEAR || — || align=right | 1.4 km || 
|-id=502 bgcolor=#FFC2E0
| 228502 ||  || — || October 12, 2001 || Haleakala || NEAT || APO || align=right data-sort-value="0.3" | 300 m || 
|-id=503 bgcolor=#fefefe
| 228503 ||  || — || October 11, 2001 || Desert Eagle || W. K. Y. Yeung || NYS || align=right | 1.2 km || 
|-id=504 bgcolor=#fefefe
| 228504 ||  || — || October 11, 2001 || Socorro || LINEAR || — || align=right | 1.4 km || 
|-id=505 bgcolor=#fefefe
| 228505 ||  || — || October 9, 2001 || Socorro || LINEAR || H || align=right | 1.0 km || 
|-id=506 bgcolor=#fefefe
| 228506 ||  || — || October 14, 2001 || Socorro || LINEAR || NYS || align=right data-sort-value="0.89" | 890 m || 
|-id=507 bgcolor=#E9E9E9
| 228507 ||  || — || October 14, 2001 || Socorro || LINEAR || — || align=right | 1.6 km || 
|-id=508 bgcolor=#fefefe
| 228508 ||  || — || October 13, 2001 || Socorro || LINEAR || NYS || align=right data-sort-value="0.86" | 860 m || 
|-id=509 bgcolor=#fefefe
| 228509 ||  || — || October 14, 2001 || Socorro || LINEAR || ERI || align=right | 2.8 km || 
|-id=510 bgcolor=#fefefe
| 228510 ||  || — || October 14, 2001 || Socorro || LINEAR || NYS || align=right | 1.0 km || 
|-id=511 bgcolor=#fefefe
| 228511 ||  || — || October 14, 2001 || Socorro || LINEAR || — || align=right | 1.1 km || 
|-id=512 bgcolor=#E9E9E9
| 228512 ||  || — || October 15, 2001 || Desert Eagle || W. K. Y. Yeung || EUN || align=right | 1.5 km || 
|-id=513 bgcolor=#fefefe
| 228513 ||  || — || October 13, 2001 || Palomar || NEAT || KLI || align=right | 2.9 km || 
|-id=514 bgcolor=#fefefe
| 228514 ||  || — || October 10, 2001 || Palomar || NEAT || — || align=right | 1.5 km || 
|-id=515 bgcolor=#E9E9E9
| 228515 ||  || — || October 14, 2001 || Socorro || LINEAR || — || align=right | 1.7 km || 
|-id=516 bgcolor=#FA8072
| 228516 ||  || — || October 14, 2001 || Haleakala || NEAT || H || align=right | 1.1 km || 
|-id=517 bgcolor=#fefefe
| 228517 ||  || — || October 14, 2001 || Socorro || LINEAR || — || align=right | 1.4 km || 
|-id=518 bgcolor=#fefefe
| 228518 ||  || — || October 15, 2001 || Palomar || NEAT || V || align=right data-sort-value="0.92" | 920 m || 
|-id=519 bgcolor=#E9E9E9
| 228519 ||  || — || October 13, 2001 || Anderson Mesa || LONEOS || — || align=right | 1.3 km || 
|-id=520 bgcolor=#fefefe
| 228520 || 2001 UJ || — || October 16, 2001 || Socorro || LINEAR || H || align=right data-sort-value="0.89" | 890 m || 
|-id=521 bgcolor=#fefefe
| 228521 ||  || — || October 16, 2001 || Socorro || LINEAR || — || align=right data-sort-value="0.93" | 930 m || 
|-id=522 bgcolor=#fefefe
| 228522 ||  || — || October 18, 2001 || Socorro || LINEAR || — || align=right | 1.6 km || 
|-id=523 bgcolor=#fefefe
| 228523 ||  || — || October 16, 2001 || Socorro || LINEAR || — || align=right | 3.2 km || 
|-id=524 bgcolor=#fefefe
| 228524 ||  || — || October 16, 2001 || Socorro || LINEAR || NYS || align=right data-sort-value="0.90" | 900 m || 
|-id=525 bgcolor=#E9E9E9
| 228525 ||  || — || October 17, 2001 || Socorro || LINEAR || — || align=right | 1.2 km || 
|-id=526 bgcolor=#fefefe
| 228526 ||  || — || October 20, 2001 || Socorro || LINEAR || NYS || align=right | 1.1 km || 
|-id=527 bgcolor=#fefefe
| 228527 ||  || — || October 20, 2001 || Socorro || LINEAR || — || align=right | 1.4 km || 
|-id=528 bgcolor=#fefefe
| 228528 ||  || — || October 22, 2001 || Socorro || LINEAR || NYS || align=right | 1.0 km || 
|-id=529 bgcolor=#E9E9E9
| 228529 ||  || — || October 22, 2001 || Socorro || LINEAR || — || align=right | 1.3 km || 
|-id=530 bgcolor=#fefefe
| 228530 ||  || — || October 22, 2001 || Socorro || LINEAR || NYS || align=right | 1.0 km || 
|-id=531 bgcolor=#fefefe
| 228531 ||  || — || October 23, 2001 || Socorro || LINEAR || NYS || align=right data-sort-value="0.98" | 980 m || 
|-id=532 bgcolor=#E9E9E9
| 228532 ||  || — || November 9, 2001 || Socorro || LINEAR || — || align=right | 1.0 km || 
|-id=533 bgcolor=#E9E9E9
| 228533 ||  || — || November 9, 2001 || Socorro || LINEAR || RAF || align=right | 1.5 km || 
|-id=534 bgcolor=#E9E9E9
| 228534 ||  || — || November 9, 2001 || Socorro || LINEAR || — || align=right | 1.3 km || 
|-id=535 bgcolor=#d6d6d6
| 228535 ||  || — || November 10, 2001 || Socorro || LINEAR || HIL3:2 || align=right | 7.4 km || 
|-id=536 bgcolor=#E9E9E9
| 228536 ||  || — || November 10, 2001 || Socorro || LINEAR || — || align=right | 2.5 km || 
|-id=537 bgcolor=#E9E9E9
| 228537 ||  || — || November 10, 2001 || Palomar || NEAT || — || align=right | 1.5 km || 
|-id=538 bgcolor=#fefefe
| 228538 ||  || — || November 15, 2001 || Socorro || LINEAR || — || align=right | 1.8 km || 
|-id=539 bgcolor=#fefefe
| 228539 ||  || — || November 12, 2001 || Socorro || LINEAR || — || align=right | 1.2 km || 
|-id=540 bgcolor=#E9E9E9
| 228540 ||  || — || November 12, 2001 || Socorro || LINEAR || — || align=right | 1.3 km || 
|-id=541 bgcolor=#fefefe
| 228541 ||  || — || November 17, 2001 || Socorro || LINEAR || SUL || align=right | 2.6 km || 
|-id=542 bgcolor=#E9E9E9
| 228542 ||  || — || November 17, 2001 || Socorro || LINEAR || — || align=right data-sort-value="0.98" | 980 m || 
|-id=543 bgcolor=#fefefe
| 228543 ||  || — || November 17, 2001 || Socorro || LINEAR || NYS || align=right | 1.0 km || 
|-id=544 bgcolor=#E9E9E9
| 228544 ||  || — || November 19, 2001 || Socorro || LINEAR || — || align=right | 1.3 km || 
|-id=545 bgcolor=#fefefe
| 228545 ||  || — || November 19, 2001 || Socorro || LINEAR || — || align=right | 1.4 km || 
|-id=546 bgcolor=#fefefe
| 228546 ||  || — || November 20, 2001 || Socorro || LINEAR || MAS || align=right | 1.1 km || 
|-id=547 bgcolor=#E9E9E9
| 228547 ||  || — || November 20, 2001 || Kitt Peak || Spacewatch || — || align=right | 1.2 km || 
|-id=548 bgcolor=#fefefe
| 228548 ||  || — || December 8, 2001 || Socorro || LINEAR || H || align=right | 1.1 km || 
|-id=549 bgcolor=#fefefe
| 228549 ||  || — || December 9, 2001 || Socorro || LINEAR || H || align=right | 1.0 km || 
|-id=550 bgcolor=#fefefe
| 228550 ||  || — || December 10, 2001 || Socorro || LINEAR || NYS || align=right data-sort-value="0.78" | 780 m || 
|-id=551 bgcolor=#E9E9E9
| 228551 ||  || — || December 9, 2001 || Socorro || LINEAR || — || align=right | 1.1 km || 
|-id=552 bgcolor=#fefefe
| 228552 ||  || — || December 11, 2001 || Socorro || LINEAR || H || align=right data-sort-value="0.84" | 840 m || 
|-id=553 bgcolor=#E9E9E9
| 228553 ||  || — || December 11, 2001 || Socorro || LINEAR || — || align=right | 1.1 km || 
|-id=554 bgcolor=#fefefe
| 228554 ||  || — || December 11, 2001 || Socorro || LINEAR || NYS || align=right | 1.2 km || 
|-id=555 bgcolor=#E9E9E9
| 228555 ||  || — || December 10, 2001 || Socorro || LINEAR || — || align=right | 3.6 km || 
|-id=556 bgcolor=#fefefe
| 228556 ||  || — || December 11, 2001 || Socorro || LINEAR || — || align=right | 1.7 km || 
|-id=557 bgcolor=#fefefe
| 228557 ||  || — || December 14, 2001 || Socorro || LINEAR || H || align=right data-sort-value="0.84" | 840 m || 
|-id=558 bgcolor=#fefefe
| 228558 ||  || — || December 14, 2001 || Socorro || LINEAR || H || align=right | 1.3 km || 
|-id=559 bgcolor=#d6d6d6
| 228559 ||  || — || December 14, 2001 || Kitt Peak || Spacewatch || 3:2 || align=right | 6.6 km || 
|-id=560 bgcolor=#fefefe
| 228560 ||  || — || December 14, 2001 || Socorro || LINEAR || — || align=right | 1.5 km || 
|-id=561 bgcolor=#E9E9E9
| 228561 ||  || — || December 14, 2001 || Socorro || LINEAR || — || align=right | 1.8 km || 
|-id=562 bgcolor=#fefefe
| 228562 ||  || — || December 14, 2001 || Socorro || LINEAR || — || align=right | 1.8 km || 
|-id=563 bgcolor=#E9E9E9
| 228563 ||  || — || December 14, 2001 || Socorro || LINEAR || — || align=right | 1.8 km || 
|-id=564 bgcolor=#E9E9E9
| 228564 ||  || — || December 14, 2001 || Socorro || LINEAR || — || align=right | 1.5 km || 
|-id=565 bgcolor=#E9E9E9
| 228565 ||  || — || December 14, 2001 || Socorro || LINEAR || — || align=right | 1.6 km || 
|-id=566 bgcolor=#E9E9E9
| 228566 ||  || — || December 14, 2001 || Socorro || LINEAR || — || align=right | 2.7 km || 
|-id=567 bgcolor=#fefefe
| 228567 ||  || — || December 11, 2001 || Socorro || LINEAR || V || align=right | 1.1 km || 
|-id=568 bgcolor=#d6d6d6
| 228568 ||  || — || December 11, 2001 || Socorro || LINEAR || 3:2 || align=right | 8.3 km || 
|-id=569 bgcolor=#E9E9E9
| 228569 ||  || — || December 15, 2001 || Socorro || LINEAR || ADE || align=right | 3.7 km || 
|-id=570 bgcolor=#E9E9E9
| 228570 ||  || — || December 15, 2001 || Socorro || LINEAR || — || align=right | 1.2 km || 
|-id=571 bgcolor=#d6d6d6
| 228571 ||  || — || December 15, 2001 || Socorro || LINEAR || 3:2 || align=right | 7.5 km || 
|-id=572 bgcolor=#FA8072
| 228572 ||  || — || December 23, 2001 || Kingsnake || J. V. McClusky || — || align=right data-sort-value="0.84" | 840 m || 
|-id=573 bgcolor=#fefefe
| 228573 ||  || — || December 17, 2001 || Socorro || LINEAR || — || align=right | 1.6 km || 
|-id=574 bgcolor=#E9E9E9
| 228574 ||  || — || December 18, 2001 || Socorro || LINEAR || — || align=right | 1.5 km || 
|-id=575 bgcolor=#fefefe
| 228575 ||  || — || December 18, 2001 || Socorro || LINEAR || — || align=right | 1.2 km || 
|-id=576 bgcolor=#E9E9E9
| 228576 ||  || — || December 18, 2001 || Socorro || LINEAR || — || align=right | 2.3 km || 
|-id=577 bgcolor=#E9E9E9
| 228577 ||  || — || December 18, 2001 || Socorro || LINEAR || MAR || align=right | 1.4 km || 
|-id=578 bgcolor=#E9E9E9
| 228578 ||  || — || December 18, 2001 || Palomar || NEAT || — || align=right | 1.8 km || 
|-id=579 bgcolor=#fefefe
| 228579 ||  || — || December 18, 2001 || Palomar || NEAT || H || align=right data-sort-value="0.87" | 870 m || 
|-id=580 bgcolor=#E9E9E9
| 228580 ||  || — || December 18, 2001 || Palomar || NEAT || — || align=right | 1.7 km || 
|-id=581 bgcolor=#E9E9E9
| 228581 ||  || — || December 17, 2001 || Socorro || LINEAR || — || align=right | 4.1 km || 
|-id=582 bgcolor=#E9E9E9
| 228582 ||  || — || December 18, 2001 || Palomar || NEAT || — || align=right | 2.3 km || 
|-id=583 bgcolor=#E9E9E9
| 228583 ||  || — || December 21, 2001 || Kitt Peak || Spacewatch || KRM || align=right | 3.9 km || 
|-id=584 bgcolor=#E9E9E9
| 228584 ||  || — || December 17, 2001 || Socorro || LINEAR || — || align=right | 3.8 km || 
|-id=585 bgcolor=#E9E9E9
| 228585 ||  || — || December 17, 2001 || Socorro || LINEAR || — || align=right | 1.6 km || 
|-id=586 bgcolor=#fefefe
| 228586 ||  || — || January 8, 2002 || Socorro || LINEAR || H || align=right data-sort-value="0.68" | 680 m || 
|-id=587 bgcolor=#FFC2E0
| 228587 ||  || — || January 9, 2002 || Socorro || LINEAR || AMO || align=right data-sort-value="0.45" | 450 m || 
|-id=588 bgcolor=#E9E9E9
| 228588 ||  || — || January 11, 2002 || Kitt Peak || Spacewatch || — || align=right | 2.7 km || 
|-id=589 bgcolor=#fefefe
| 228589 ||  || — || January 8, 2002 || Socorro || LINEAR || V || align=right data-sort-value="0.97" | 970 m || 
|-id=590 bgcolor=#E9E9E9
| 228590 ||  || — || January 9, 2002 || Socorro || LINEAR || — || align=right | 1.3 km || 
|-id=591 bgcolor=#E9E9E9
| 228591 ||  || — || January 9, 2002 || Socorro || LINEAR || RAF || align=right | 1.3 km || 
|-id=592 bgcolor=#E9E9E9
| 228592 ||  || — || January 9, 2002 || Socorro || LINEAR || — || align=right | 1.3 km || 
|-id=593 bgcolor=#E9E9E9
| 228593 ||  || — || January 9, 2002 || Socorro || LINEAR || — || align=right | 1.3 km || 
|-id=594 bgcolor=#E9E9E9
| 228594 ||  || — || January 12, 2002 || Socorro || LINEAR || — || align=right | 1.4 km || 
|-id=595 bgcolor=#E9E9E9
| 228595 ||  || — || January 8, 2002 || Socorro || LINEAR || EUN || align=right | 1.9 km || 
|-id=596 bgcolor=#E9E9E9
| 228596 ||  || — || January 8, 2002 || Socorro || LINEAR || — || align=right | 2.1 km || 
|-id=597 bgcolor=#E9E9E9
| 228597 ||  || — || January 8, 2002 || Socorro || LINEAR || — || align=right | 1.1 km || 
|-id=598 bgcolor=#E9E9E9
| 228598 ||  || — || January 8, 2002 || Socorro || LINEAR || — || align=right data-sort-value="0.98" | 980 m || 
|-id=599 bgcolor=#E9E9E9
| 228599 ||  || — || January 9, 2002 || Socorro || LINEAR || — || align=right | 2.3 km || 
|-id=600 bgcolor=#E9E9E9
| 228600 ||  || — || January 9, 2002 || Socorro || LINEAR || — || align=right | 1.8 km || 
|}

228601–228700 

|-bgcolor=#E9E9E9
| 228601 ||  || — || January 13, 2002 || Socorro || LINEAR || — || align=right | 1.4 km || 
|-id=602 bgcolor=#E9E9E9
| 228602 ||  || — || January 13, 2002 || Socorro || LINEAR || — || align=right | 3.1 km || 
|-id=603 bgcolor=#E9E9E9
| 228603 ||  || — || January 14, 2002 || Socorro || LINEAR || — || align=right | 1.4 km || 
|-id=604 bgcolor=#E9E9E9
| 228604 ||  || — || January 14, 2002 || Socorro || LINEAR || — || align=right | 1.3 km || 
|-id=605 bgcolor=#E9E9E9
| 228605 ||  || — || January 8, 2002 || Haleakala || NEAT || — || align=right | 5.0 km || 
|-id=606 bgcolor=#E9E9E9
| 228606 ||  || — || January 18, 2002 || Anderson Mesa || LONEOS || — || align=right | 3.2 km || 
|-id=607 bgcolor=#E9E9E9
| 228607 ||  || — || January 19, 2002 || Anderson Mesa || LONEOS || ADE || align=right | 4.3 km || 
|-id=608 bgcolor=#E9E9E9
| 228608 ||  || — || January 18, 2002 || Socorro || LINEAR || — || align=right | 1.7 km || 
|-id=609 bgcolor=#E9E9E9
| 228609 ||  || — || January 21, 2002 || Socorro || LINEAR || — || align=right | 1.5 km || 
|-id=610 bgcolor=#E9E9E9
| 228610 ||  || — || January 21, 2002 || Palomar || NEAT || — || align=right | 1.5 km || 
|-id=611 bgcolor=#E9E9E9
| 228611 ||  || — || January 23, 2002 || Socorro || LINEAR || GEF || align=right | 1.7 km || 
|-id=612 bgcolor=#E9E9E9
| 228612 ||  || — || January 26, 2002 || Palomar || NEAT || — || align=right | 1.2 km || 
|-id=613 bgcolor=#E9E9E9
| 228613 ||  || — || February 4, 2002 || Haleakala || NEAT || — || align=right | 1.9 km || 
|-id=614 bgcolor=#E9E9E9
| 228614 ||  || — || February 6, 2002 || Socorro || LINEAR || — || align=right | 1.4 km || 
|-id=615 bgcolor=#E9E9E9
| 228615 ||  || — || February 6, 2002 || Socorro || LINEAR || — || align=right | 1.8 km || 
|-id=616 bgcolor=#E9E9E9
| 228616 ||  || — || February 7, 2002 || Socorro || LINEAR || — || align=right | 2.3 km || 
|-id=617 bgcolor=#fefefe
| 228617 ||  || — || February 7, 2002 || Palomar || NEAT || H || align=right | 1.3 km || 
|-id=618 bgcolor=#E9E9E9
| 228618 ||  || — || February 3, 2002 || Haleakala || NEAT || — || align=right | 1.2 km || 
|-id=619 bgcolor=#E9E9E9
| 228619 ||  || — || February 7, 2002 || Socorro || LINEAR || — || align=right | 1.4 km || 
|-id=620 bgcolor=#E9E9E9
| 228620 ||  || — || February 7, 2002 || Socorro || LINEAR || — || align=right | 1.4 km || 
|-id=621 bgcolor=#E9E9E9
| 228621 ||  || — || February 7, 2002 || Socorro || LINEAR || MIS || align=right | 3.1 km || 
|-id=622 bgcolor=#E9E9E9
| 228622 ||  || — || February 7, 2002 || Socorro || LINEAR || — || align=right | 2.0 km || 
|-id=623 bgcolor=#E9E9E9
| 228623 ||  || — || February 7, 2002 || Socorro || LINEAR || — || align=right | 2.7 km || 
|-id=624 bgcolor=#E9E9E9
| 228624 ||  || — || February 7, 2002 || Socorro || LINEAR || — || align=right | 2.5 km || 
|-id=625 bgcolor=#E9E9E9
| 228625 ||  || — || February 7, 2002 || Socorro || LINEAR || — || align=right | 1.3 km || 
|-id=626 bgcolor=#E9E9E9
| 228626 ||  || — || February 9, 2002 || Socorro || LINEAR || — || align=right | 1.6 km || 
|-id=627 bgcolor=#E9E9E9
| 228627 ||  || — || February 7, 2002 || Socorro || LINEAR || — || align=right | 2.5 km || 
|-id=628 bgcolor=#E9E9E9
| 228628 ||  || — || February 10, 2002 || Socorro || LINEAR || — || align=right | 1.7 km || 
|-id=629 bgcolor=#E9E9E9
| 228629 ||  || — || February 10, 2002 || Socorro || LINEAR || — || align=right | 1.9 km || 
|-id=630 bgcolor=#E9E9E9
| 228630 ||  || — || February 6, 2002 || Palomar || NEAT || — || align=right | 1.4 km || 
|-id=631 bgcolor=#E9E9E9
| 228631 ||  || — || February 12, 2002 || Palomar || NEAT || — || align=right | 2.4 km || 
|-id=632 bgcolor=#E9E9E9
| 228632 ||  || — || February 3, 2002 || Palomar || NEAT || EUN || align=right | 1.9 km || 
|-id=633 bgcolor=#E9E9E9
| 228633 ||  || — || February 6, 2002 || Kitt Peak || M. W. Buie || — || align=right | 2.4 km || 
|-id=634 bgcolor=#E9E9E9
| 228634 ||  || — || February 6, 2002 || Palomar || NEAT || — || align=right | 1.2 km || 
|-id=635 bgcolor=#E9E9E9
| 228635 ||  || — || February 8, 2002 || Palomar || NEAT || MIT || align=right | 3.7 km || 
|-id=636 bgcolor=#E9E9E9
| 228636 ||  || — || February 8, 2002 || Kitt Peak || Spacewatch || — || align=right | 1.1 km || 
|-id=637 bgcolor=#E9E9E9
| 228637 ||  || — || February 10, 2002 || Socorro || LINEAR || — || align=right | 2.1 km || 
|-id=638 bgcolor=#E9E9E9
| 228638 ||  || — || February 12, 2002 || Socorro || LINEAR || — || align=right | 1.5 km || 
|-id=639 bgcolor=#E9E9E9
| 228639 ||  || — || February 10, 2002 || Socorro || LINEAR || — || align=right | 1.2 km || 
|-id=640 bgcolor=#E9E9E9
| 228640 ||  || — || March 6, 2002 || Palomar || NEAT || — || align=right | 1.5 km || 
|-id=641 bgcolor=#E9E9E9
| 228641 ||  || — || March 6, 2002 || Socorro || LINEAR || ADE || align=right | 3.9 km || 
|-id=642 bgcolor=#E9E9E9
| 228642 ||  || — || March 5, 2002 || Kitt Peak || Spacewatch || — || align=right | 3.3 km || 
|-id=643 bgcolor=#E9E9E9
| 228643 ||  || — || March 11, 2002 || Palomar || NEAT || — || align=right | 2.2 km || 
|-id=644 bgcolor=#E9E9E9
| 228644 ||  || — || March 11, 2002 || Palomar || NEAT || — || align=right | 1.7 km || 
|-id=645 bgcolor=#E9E9E9
| 228645 ||  || — || March 12, 2002 || Socorro || LINEAR || — || align=right | 1.7 km || 
|-id=646 bgcolor=#E9E9E9
| 228646 ||  || — || March 9, 2002 || Socorro || LINEAR || — || align=right | 1.9 km || 
|-id=647 bgcolor=#E9E9E9
| 228647 ||  || — || March 13, 2002 || Socorro || LINEAR || — || align=right | 3.6 km || 
|-id=648 bgcolor=#E9E9E9
| 228648 ||  || — || March 14, 2002 || Palomar || NEAT || KON || align=right | 3.3 km || 
|-id=649 bgcolor=#E9E9E9
| 228649 ||  || — || March 9, 2002 || Socorro || LINEAR || — || align=right | 3.6 km || 
|-id=650 bgcolor=#d6d6d6
| 228650 ||  || — || March 14, 2002 || Socorro || LINEAR || BRA || align=right | 2.5 km || 
|-id=651 bgcolor=#E9E9E9
| 228651 ||  || — || March 6, 2002 || Socorro || LINEAR || — || align=right | 2.7 km || 
|-id=652 bgcolor=#E9E9E9
| 228652 ||  || — || March 11, 2002 || Kitt Peak || Spacewatch || — || align=right | 1.4 km || 
|-id=653 bgcolor=#E9E9E9
| 228653 ||  || — || March 12, 2002 || Anderson Mesa || LONEOS || — || align=right | 4.0 km || 
|-id=654 bgcolor=#E9E9E9
| 228654 ||  || — || March 14, 2002 || Anderson Mesa || LONEOS || — || align=right | 3.2 km || 
|-id=655 bgcolor=#E9E9E9
| 228655 ||  || — || March 19, 2002 || Palomar || NEAT || MIT || align=right | 4.2 km || 
|-id=656 bgcolor=#E9E9E9
| 228656 ||  || — || March 20, 2002 || Palomar || NEAT || — || align=right | 4.2 km || 
|-id=657 bgcolor=#E9E9E9
| 228657 ||  || — || March 21, 2002 || Socorro || LINEAR || JUN || align=right | 1.7 km || 
|-id=658 bgcolor=#E9E9E9
| 228658 ||  || — || April 4, 2002 || Kvistaberg || UDAS || — || align=right | 2.9 km || 
|-id=659 bgcolor=#E9E9E9
| 228659 ||  || — || April 8, 2002 || Palomar || NEAT || — || align=right | 1.3 km || 
|-id=660 bgcolor=#E9E9E9
| 228660 ||  || — || April 14, 2002 || Desert Eagle || W. K. Y. Yeung || — || align=right | 2.4 km || 
|-id=661 bgcolor=#E9E9E9
| 228661 ||  || — || April 14, 2002 || Haleakala || NEAT || — || align=right | 1.5 km || 
|-id=662 bgcolor=#E9E9E9
| 228662 ||  || — || April 2, 2002 || Palomar || NEAT || — || align=right | 2.4 km || 
|-id=663 bgcolor=#E9E9E9
| 228663 ||  || — || April 9, 2002 || Anderson Mesa || LONEOS || MIT || align=right | 3.3 km || 
|-id=664 bgcolor=#E9E9E9
| 228664 ||  || — || April 9, 2002 || Socorro || LINEAR || — || align=right | 2.2 km || 
|-id=665 bgcolor=#E9E9E9
| 228665 ||  || — || April 11, 2002 || Socorro || LINEAR || — || align=right | 2.5 km || 
|-id=666 bgcolor=#E9E9E9
| 228666 ||  || — || April 12, 2002 || Socorro || LINEAR || AGN || align=right | 1.5 km || 
|-id=667 bgcolor=#E9E9E9
| 228667 ||  || — || April 11, 2002 || Palomar || NEAT || — || align=right | 3.5 km || 
|-id=668 bgcolor=#d6d6d6
| 228668 ||  || — || May 5, 2002 || Desert Eagle || W. K. Y. Yeung || — || align=right | 2.9 km || 
|-id=669 bgcolor=#E9E9E9
| 228669 ||  || — || May 7, 2002 || Socorro || LINEAR || — || align=right | 4.1 km || 
|-id=670 bgcolor=#d6d6d6
| 228670 ||  || — || May 9, 2002 || Desert Eagle || W. K. Y. Yeung || — || align=right | 4.5 km || 
|-id=671 bgcolor=#d6d6d6
| 228671 ||  || — || May 9, 2002 || Socorro || LINEAR || — || align=right | 6.5 km || 
|-id=672 bgcolor=#E9E9E9
| 228672 ||  || — || May 8, 2002 || Socorro || LINEAR || — || align=right | 4.3 km || 
|-id=673 bgcolor=#d6d6d6
| 228673 ||  || — || May 10, 2002 || Socorro || LINEAR || — || align=right | 4.6 km || 
|-id=674 bgcolor=#E9E9E9
| 228674 ||  || — || May 11, 2002 || Socorro || LINEAR || AEO || align=right | 1.8 km || 
|-id=675 bgcolor=#d6d6d6
| 228675 ||  || — || May 11, 2002 || Socorro || LINEAR || — || align=right | 4.2 km || 
|-id=676 bgcolor=#d6d6d6
| 228676 ||  || — || May 11, 2002 || Socorro || LINEAR || TEL || align=right | 2.4 km || 
|-id=677 bgcolor=#E9E9E9
| 228677 ||  || — || May 5, 2002 || Palomar || NEAT || — || align=right | 3.0 km || 
|-id=678 bgcolor=#E9E9E9
| 228678 ||  || — || May 6, 2002 || Palomar || NEAT || — || align=right | 4.1 km || 
|-id=679 bgcolor=#E9E9E9
| 228679 ||  || — || May 30, 2002 || Palomar || NEAT || — || align=right | 2.3 km || 
|-id=680 bgcolor=#d6d6d6
| 228680 ||  || — || May 18, 2002 || Palomar || NEAT || — || align=right | 3.1 km || 
|-id=681 bgcolor=#E9E9E9
| 228681 ||  || — || June 1, 2002 || Socorro || LINEAR || — || align=right | 4.6 km || 
|-id=682 bgcolor=#d6d6d6
| 228682 ||  || — || June 7, 2002 || Kitt Peak || Spacewatch || EOS || align=right | 3.1 km || 
|-id=683 bgcolor=#d6d6d6
| 228683 ||  || — || July 9, 2002 || Socorro || LINEAR || LIX || align=right | 8.3 km || 
|-id=684 bgcolor=#d6d6d6
| 228684 ||  || — || July 9, 2002 || Socorro || LINEAR || EUP || align=right | 7.3 km || 
|-id=685 bgcolor=#d6d6d6
| 228685 ||  || — || July 15, 2002 || Palomar || NEAT || — || align=right | 6.0 km || 
|-id=686 bgcolor=#d6d6d6
| 228686 ||  || — || July 2, 2002 || Palomar || NEAT || — || align=right | 4.9 km || 
|-id=687 bgcolor=#d6d6d6
| 228687 ||  || — || July 18, 2002 || Palomar || NEAT || HYG || align=right | 3.8 km || 
|-id=688 bgcolor=#d6d6d6
| 228688 ||  || — || July 21, 2002 || Palomar || NEAT || — || align=right | 4.3 km || 
|-id=689 bgcolor=#fefefe
| 228689 ||  || — || July 18, 2002 || Socorro || LINEAR || — || align=right data-sort-value="0.86" | 860 m || 
|-id=690 bgcolor=#fefefe
| 228690 ||  || — || July 18, 2002 || Palomar || NEAT || FLO || align=right | 1.8 km || 
|-id=691 bgcolor=#fefefe
| 228691 ||  || — || July 22, 2002 || Palomar || NEAT || — || align=right | 1.4 km || 
|-id=692 bgcolor=#d6d6d6
| 228692 ||  || — || August 5, 2002 || Palomar || NEAT || URS || align=right | 6.3 km || 
|-id=693 bgcolor=#fefefe
| 228693 ||  || — || August 6, 2002 || Palomar || NEAT || — || align=right data-sort-value="0.78" | 780 m || 
|-id=694 bgcolor=#d6d6d6
| 228694 ||  || — || August 14, 2002 || Palomar || NEAT || — || align=right | 5.3 km || 
|-id=695 bgcolor=#FA8072
| 228695 ||  || — || August 14, 2002 || Socorro || LINEAR || — || align=right data-sort-value="0.77" | 770 m || 
|-id=696 bgcolor=#fefefe
| 228696 ||  || — || August 14, 2002 || Socorro || LINEAR || — || align=right | 2.6 km || 
|-id=697 bgcolor=#fefefe
| 228697 ||  || — || August 11, 2002 || Palomar || NEAT || — || align=right data-sort-value="0.78" | 780 m || 
|-id=698 bgcolor=#fefefe
| 228698 ||  || — || August 11, 2002 || Palomar || NEAT || — || align=right data-sort-value="0.90" | 900 m || 
|-id=699 bgcolor=#d6d6d6
| 228699 ||  || — || August 8, 2002 || Palomar || NEAT || — || align=right | 3.1 km || 
|-id=700 bgcolor=#fefefe
| 228700 ||  || — || August 30, 2002 || Palomar || NEAT || — || align=right data-sort-value="0.92" | 920 m || 
|}

228701–228800 

|-bgcolor=#fefefe
| 228701 ||  || — || August 29, 2002 || Palomar || S. F. Hönig || — || align=right data-sort-value="0.87" | 870 m || 
|-id=702 bgcolor=#fefefe
| 228702 ||  || — || August 18, 2002 || Palomar || NEAT || — || align=right data-sort-value="0.98" | 980 m || 
|-id=703 bgcolor=#d6d6d6
| 228703 ||  || — || August 17, 2002 || Palomar || NEAT || EOS || align=right | 2.3 km || 
|-id=704 bgcolor=#d6d6d6
| 228704 ||  || — || August 19, 2002 || Palomar || NEAT || — || align=right | 5.2 km || 
|-id=705 bgcolor=#d6d6d6
| 228705 ||  || — || August 26, 2002 || Palomar || NEAT || — || align=right | 3.8 km || 
|-id=706 bgcolor=#d6d6d6
| 228706 ||  || — || August 27, 2002 || Palomar || NEAT || THM || align=right | 2.9 km || 
|-id=707 bgcolor=#d6d6d6
| 228707 ||  || — || August 27, 2002 || Palomar || NEAT || — || align=right | 3.8 km || 
|-id=708 bgcolor=#d6d6d6
| 228708 ||  || — || September 5, 2002 || Socorro || LINEAR || HYG || align=right | 5.1 km || 
|-id=709 bgcolor=#fefefe
| 228709 ||  || — || September 5, 2002 || Socorro || LINEAR || — || align=right | 1.0 km || 
|-id=710 bgcolor=#d6d6d6
| 228710 ||  || — || September 11, 2002 || Palomar || NEAT || THM || align=right | 3.8 km || 
|-id=711 bgcolor=#fefefe
| 228711 ||  || — || September 13, 2002 || Palomar || NEAT || — || align=right | 1.2 km || 
|-id=712 bgcolor=#fefefe
| 228712 ||  || — || September 14, 2002 || Palomar || NEAT || NYS || align=right | 1.8 km || 
|-id=713 bgcolor=#d6d6d6
| 228713 ||  || — || September 4, 2002 || Palomar || NEAT || — || align=right | 3.5 km || 
|-id=714 bgcolor=#d6d6d6
| 228714 ||  || — || September 3, 2002 || Palomar || NEAT || — || align=right | 4.2 km || 
|-id=715 bgcolor=#d6d6d6
| 228715 ||  || — || September 14, 2002 || Palomar || NEAT || — || align=right | 3.6 km || 
|-id=716 bgcolor=#fefefe
| 228716 ||  || — || September 8, 2002 || Haleakala || NEAT || FLO || align=right data-sort-value="0.79" | 790 m || 
|-id=717 bgcolor=#fefefe
| 228717 ||  || — || September 29, 2002 || Haleakala || NEAT || V || align=right data-sort-value="0.85" | 850 m || 
|-id=718 bgcolor=#fefefe
| 228718 ||  || — || September 17, 2002 || Palomar || NEAT || — || align=right | 1.3 km || 
|-id=719 bgcolor=#d6d6d6
| 228719 || 2002 TP || — || October 1, 2002 || Anderson Mesa || LONEOS || HYG || align=right | 4.5 km || 
|-id=720 bgcolor=#fefefe
| 228720 ||  || — || October 1, 2002 || Socorro || LINEAR || — || align=right data-sort-value="0.92" | 920 m || 
|-id=721 bgcolor=#fefefe
| 228721 ||  || — || October 2, 2002 || Socorro || LINEAR || — || align=right data-sort-value="0.77" | 770 m || 
|-id=722 bgcolor=#fefefe
| 228722 ||  || — || October 2, 2002 || Socorro || LINEAR || FLO || align=right | 1.0 km || 
|-id=723 bgcolor=#fefefe
| 228723 ||  || — || October 2, 2002 || Socorro || LINEAR || FLO || align=right | 1.1 km || 
|-id=724 bgcolor=#fefefe
| 228724 ||  || — || October 2, 2002 || Socorro || LINEAR || NYS || align=right | 1.00 km || 
|-id=725 bgcolor=#fefefe
| 228725 ||  || — || October 1, 2002 || Anderson Mesa || LONEOS || — || align=right | 1.4 km || 
|-id=726 bgcolor=#fefefe
| 228726 ||  || — || October 1, 2002 || Anderson Mesa || LONEOS || — || align=right | 1.1 km || 
|-id=727 bgcolor=#fefefe
| 228727 ||  || — || October 3, 2002 || Socorro || LINEAR || — || align=right | 1.1 km || 
|-id=728 bgcolor=#d6d6d6
| 228728 ||  || — || October 3, 2002 || Palomar || NEAT || — || align=right | 5.8 km || 
|-id=729 bgcolor=#fefefe
| 228729 ||  || — || October 3, 2002 || Palomar || NEAT || — || align=right | 1.4 km || 
|-id=730 bgcolor=#fefefe
| 228730 ||  || — || October 4, 2002 || Palomar || NEAT || — || align=right | 1.2 km || 
|-id=731 bgcolor=#d6d6d6
| 228731 ||  || — || October 4, 2002 || Socorro || LINEAR || — || align=right | 4.2 km || 
|-id=732 bgcolor=#fefefe
| 228732 ||  || — || October 4, 2002 || Socorro || LINEAR || — || align=right data-sort-value="0.98" | 980 m || 
|-id=733 bgcolor=#fefefe
| 228733 ||  || — || October 4, 2002 || Palomar || NEAT || FLO || align=right | 1.9 km || 
|-id=734 bgcolor=#d6d6d6
| 228734 ||  || — || October 5, 2002 || Palomar || NEAT || — || align=right | 5.0 km || 
|-id=735 bgcolor=#d6d6d6
| 228735 ||  || — || October 3, 2002 || Palomar || NEAT || — || align=right | 5.2 km || 
|-id=736 bgcolor=#fefefe
| 228736 ||  || — || October 4, 2002 || Socorro || LINEAR || — || align=right | 1.1 km || 
|-id=737 bgcolor=#fefefe
| 228737 ||  || — || October 7, 2002 || Socorro || LINEAR || FLO || align=right | 1.1 km || 
|-id=738 bgcolor=#fefefe
| 228738 ||  || — || October 9, 2002 || Socorro || LINEAR || — || align=right data-sort-value="0.82" | 820 m || 
|-id=739 bgcolor=#fefefe
| 228739 ||  || — || October 9, 2002 || Socorro || LINEAR || FLO || align=right | 1.2 km || 
|-id=740 bgcolor=#fefefe
| 228740 ||  || — || October 10, 2002 || Socorro || LINEAR || FLO || align=right data-sort-value="0.91" | 910 m || 
|-id=741 bgcolor=#fefefe
| 228741 ||  || — || October 10, 2002 || Socorro || LINEAR || — || align=right | 1.2 km || 
|-id=742 bgcolor=#fefefe
| 228742 ||  || — || October 10, 2002 || Socorro || LINEAR || — || align=right | 1.2 km || 
|-id=743 bgcolor=#fefefe
| 228743 ||  || — || October 10, 2002 || Socorro || LINEAR || FLO || align=right | 1.1 km || 
|-id=744 bgcolor=#fefefe
| 228744 ||  || — || October 31, 2002 || Palomar || NEAT || — || align=right | 1.1 km || 
|-id=745 bgcolor=#fefefe
| 228745 ||  || — || October 31, 2002 || Socorro || LINEAR || V || align=right data-sort-value="0.91" | 910 m || 
|-id=746 bgcolor=#d6d6d6
| 228746 ||  || — || October 29, 2002 || Apache Point || SDSS || LIX || align=right | 4.1 km || 
|-id=747 bgcolor=#fefefe
| 228747 ||  || — || November 1, 2002 || Palomar || NEAT || FLO || align=right | 1.0 km || 
|-id=748 bgcolor=#fefefe
| 228748 ||  || — || November 1, 2002 || Palomar || NEAT || FLO || align=right data-sort-value="0.88" | 880 m || 
|-id=749 bgcolor=#fefefe
| 228749 ||  || — || November 1, 2002 || Palomar || NEAT || FLO || align=right | 1.2 km || 
|-id=750 bgcolor=#fefefe
| 228750 ||  || — || November 1, 2002 || Socorro || LINEAR || — || align=right | 1.4 km || 
|-id=751 bgcolor=#fefefe
| 228751 ||  || — || November 5, 2002 || Socorro || LINEAR || FLO || align=right data-sort-value="0.91" | 910 m || 
|-id=752 bgcolor=#fefefe
| 228752 ||  || — || November 5, 2002 || Socorro || LINEAR || — || align=right | 1.1 km || 
|-id=753 bgcolor=#fefefe
| 228753 ||  || — || November 5, 2002 || Socorro || LINEAR || V || align=right | 1.0 km || 
|-id=754 bgcolor=#fefefe
| 228754 ||  || — || November 5, 2002 || Socorro || LINEAR || — || align=right data-sort-value="0.96" | 960 m || 
|-id=755 bgcolor=#fefefe
| 228755 ||  || — || November 6, 2002 || Socorro || LINEAR || V || align=right data-sort-value="0.92" | 920 m || 
|-id=756 bgcolor=#fefefe
| 228756 ||  || — || November 7, 2002 || Socorro || LINEAR || FLO || align=right data-sort-value="0.94" | 940 m || 
|-id=757 bgcolor=#fefefe
| 228757 ||  || — || November 7, 2002 || Socorro || LINEAR || — || align=right | 1.0 km || 
|-id=758 bgcolor=#fefefe
| 228758 ||  || — || November 7, 2002 || Socorro || LINEAR || V || align=right | 1.2 km || 
|-id=759 bgcolor=#fefefe
| 228759 ||  || — || November 11, 2002 || Socorro || LINEAR || — || align=right | 1.1 km || 
|-id=760 bgcolor=#fefefe
| 228760 ||  || — || November 11, 2002 || Socorro || LINEAR || — || align=right | 1.6 km || 
|-id=761 bgcolor=#fefefe
| 228761 ||  || — || November 12, 2002 || Socorro || LINEAR || — || align=right | 2.5 km || 
|-id=762 bgcolor=#fefefe
| 228762 ||  || — || November 12, 2002 || Socorro || LINEAR || — || align=right | 1.1 km || 
|-id=763 bgcolor=#fefefe
| 228763 ||  || — || November 12, 2002 || Socorro || LINEAR || — || align=right | 1.2 km || 
|-id=764 bgcolor=#fefefe
| 228764 ||  || — || November 14, 2002 || Socorro || LINEAR || — || align=right | 1.3 km || 
|-id=765 bgcolor=#d6d6d6
| 228765 ||  || — || November 13, 2002 || Kingsnake || J. V. McClusky || — || align=right | 7.4 km || 
|-id=766 bgcolor=#fefefe
| 228766 ||  || — || November 4, 2002 || Palomar || NEAT || — || align=right | 1.9 km || 
|-id=767 bgcolor=#fefefe
| 228767 ||  || — || November 24, 2002 || Palomar || NEAT || FLO || align=right data-sort-value="0.89" | 890 m || 
|-id=768 bgcolor=#fefefe
| 228768 ||  || — || November 30, 2002 || Socorro || LINEAR || PHO || align=right | 1.1 km || 
|-id=769 bgcolor=#fefefe
| 228769 ||  || — || November 24, 2002 || Palomar || NEAT || NYS || align=right data-sort-value="0.83" | 830 m || 
|-id=770 bgcolor=#fefefe
| 228770 ||  || — || November 16, 2002 || Palomar || NEAT || — || align=right | 1.1 km || 
|-id=771 bgcolor=#fefefe
| 228771 ||  || — || December 5, 2002 || Socorro || LINEAR || — || align=right | 1.5 km || 
|-id=772 bgcolor=#fefefe
| 228772 ||  || — || December 2, 2002 || Socorro || LINEAR || V || align=right data-sort-value="0.95" | 950 m || 
|-id=773 bgcolor=#fefefe
| 228773 ||  || — || December 5, 2002 || Socorro || LINEAR || — || align=right | 1.1 km || 
|-id=774 bgcolor=#fefefe
| 228774 ||  || — || December 5, 2002 || Palomar || NEAT || — || align=right | 1.3 km || 
|-id=775 bgcolor=#fefefe
| 228775 ||  || — || December 8, 2002 || Desert Eagle || W. K. Y. Yeung || FLO || align=right data-sort-value="0.84" | 840 m || 
|-id=776 bgcolor=#fefefe
| 228776 ||  || — || December 6, 2002 || Socorro || LINEAR || EUT || align=right data-sort-value="0.72" | 720 m || 
|-id=777 bgcolor=#fefefe
| 228777 ||  || — || December 6, 2002 || Socorro || LINEAR || NYS || align=right | 1.7 km || 
|-id=778 bgcolor=#fefefe
| 228778 ||  || — || December 10, 2002 || Socorro || LINEAR || FLO || align=right | 1.1 km || 
|-id=779 bgcolor=#fefefe
| 228779 ||  || — || December 10, 2002 || Palomar || NEAT || — || align=right | 1.3 km || 
|-id=780 bgcolor=#E9E9E9
| 228780 ||  || — || December 11, 2002 || Socorro || LINEAR || — || align=right | 2.5 km || 
|-id=781 bgcolor=#fefefe
| 228781 ||  || — || December 5, 2002 || Socorro || LINEAR || FLO || align=right | 1.4 km || 
|-id=782 bgcolor=#fefefe
| 228782 ||  || — || December 5, 2002 || Socorro || LINEAR || — || align=right data-sort-value="0.86" | 860 m || 
|-id=783 bgcolor=#fefefe
| 228783 ||  || — || December 6, 2002 || Socorro || LINEAR || — || align=right data-sort-value="0.90" | 900 m || 
|-id=784 bgcolor=#fefefe
| 228784 ||  || — || December 6, 2002 || Socorro || LINEAR || FLO || align=right data-sort-value="0.84" | 840 m || 
|-id=785 bgcolor=#fefefe
| 228785 ||  || — || December 28, 2002 || Anderson Mesa || LONEOS || — || align=right | 1.5 km || 
|-id=786 bgcolor=#fefefe
| 228786 ||  || — || December 31, 2002 || Socorro || LINEAR || — || align=right | 1.4 km || 
|-id=787 bgcolor=#fefefe
| 228787 ||  || — || December 31, 2002 || Socorro || LINEAR || — || align=right | 1.5 km || 
|-id=788 bgcolor=#fefefe
| 228788 ||  || — || December 31, 2002 || Socorro || LINEAR || V || align=right | 1.1 km || 
|-id=789 bgcolor=#fefefe
| 228789 ||  || — || December 31, 2002 || Socorro || LINEAR || PHO || align=right | 1.4 km || 
|-id=790 bgcolor=#fefefe
| 228790 ||  || — || December 31, 2002 || Socorro || LINEAR || V || align=right | 1.1 km || 
|-id=791 bgcolor=#fefefe
| 228791 ||  || — || December 31, 2002 || Socorro || LINEAR || NYSfast? || align=right | 1.0 km || 
|-id=792 bgcolor=#fefefe
| 228792 ||  || — || December 31, 2002 || Socorro || LINEAR || — || align=right | 1.3 km || 
|-id=793 bgcolor=#fefefe
| 228793 ||  || — || December 31, 2002 || Socorro || LINEAR || — || align=right | 1.4 km || 
|-id=794 bgcolor=#fefefe
| 228794 ||  || — || January 1, 2003 || Socorro || LINEAR || — || align=right | 1.4 km || 
|-id=795 bgcolor=#fefefe
| 228795 ||  || — || January 4, 2003 || Socorro || LINEAR || — || align=right | 1.1 km || 
|-id=796 bgcolor=#fefefe
| 228796 ||  || — || January 4, 2003 || Socorro || LINEAR || NYS || align=right data-sort-value="0.90" | 900 m || 
|-id=797 bgcolor=#fefefe
| 228797 ||  || — || January 5, 2003 || Socorro || LINEAR || — || align=right data-sort-value="0.90" | 900 m || 
|-id=798 bgcolor=#fefefe
| 228798 ||  || — || January 5, 2003 || Socorro || LINEAR || MAS || align=right | 1.2 km || 
|-id=799 bgcolor=#fefefe
| 228799 ||  || — || January 7, 2003 || Socorro || LINEAR || — || align=right | 1.7 km || 
|-id=800 bgcolor=#fefefe
| 228800 ||  || — || January 5, 2003 || Socorro || LINEAR || — || align=right | 2.5 km || 
|}

228801–228900 

|-bgcolor=#fefefe
| 228801 ||  || — || January 5, 2003 || Socorro || LINEAR || — || align=right | 2.9 km || 
|-id=802 bgcolor=#fefefe
| 228802 ||  || — || January 7, 2003 || Socorro || LINEAR || — || align=right | 1.2 km || 
|-id=803 bgcolor=#fefefe
| 228803 ||  || — || January 8, 2003 || Socorro || LINEAR || V || align=right | 1.2 km || 
|-id=804 bgcolor=#fefefe
| 228804 ||  || — || January 8, 2003 || Socorro || LINEAR || V || align=right | 1.1 km || 
|-id=805 bgcolor=#fefefe
| 228805 ||  || — || January 10, 2003 || Kitt Peak || Spacewatch || — || align=right | 1.3 km || 
|-id=806 bgcolor=#fefefe
| 228806 ||  || — || January 11, 2003 || Socorro || LINEAR || PHO || align=right | 1.5 km || 
|-id=807 bgcolor=#fefefe
| 228807 ||  || — || January 8, 2003 || Socorro || LINEAR || — || align=right | 1.6 km || 
|-id=808 bgcolor=#fefefe
| 228808 ||  || — || January 2, 2003 || Socorro || LINEAR || — || align=right | 1.4 km || 
|-id=809 bgcolor=#fefefe
| 228809 ||  || — || January 5, 2003 || Anderson Mesa || LONEOS || — || align=right | 2.6 km || 
|-id=810 bgcolor=#FA8072
| 228810 ||  || — || January 25, 2003 || Socorro || LINEAR || — || align=right | 1.5 km || 
|-id=811 bgcolor=#fefefe
| 228811 ||  || — || January 24, 2003 || Palomar || NEAT || V || align=right | 1.2 km || 
|-id=812 bgcolor=#fefefe
| 228812 ||  || — || January 26, 2003 || Haleakala || NEAT || FLO || align=right | 1.0 km || 
|-id=813 bgcolor=#fefefe
| 228813 ||  || — || January 26, 2003 || Haleakala || NEAT || ERI || align=right | 1.2 km || 
|-id=814 bgcolor=#fefefe
| 228814 ||  || — || January 27, 2003 || Socorro || LINEAR || — || align=right | 1.1 km || 
|-id=815 bgcolor=#fefefe
| 228815 ||  || — || January 25, 2003 || Palomar || NEAT || — || align=right | 1.3 km || 
|-id=816 bgcolor=#fefefe
| 228816 ||  || — || January 26, 2003 || Haleakala || NEAT || — || align=right | 1.2 km || 
|-id=817 bgcolor=#fefefe
| 228817 ||  || — || January 27, 2003 || Socorro || LINEAR || FLO || align=right | 1.0 km || 
|-id=818 bgcolor=#fefefe
| 228818 ||  || — || January 27, 2003 || Anderson Mesa || LONEOS || NYS || align=right data-sort-value="0.84" | 840 m || 
|-id=819 bgcolor=#fefefe
| 228819 ||  || — || January 27, 2003 || Haleakala || NEAT || NYS || align=right | 1.9 km || 
|-id=820 bgcolor=#fefefe
| 228820 ||  || — || January 27, 2003 || Haleakala || NEAT || NYS || align=right data-sort-value="0.88" | 880 m || 
|-id=821 bgcolor=#fefefe
| 228821 ||  || — || January 27, 2003 || Socorro || LINEAR || NYS || align=right data-sort-value="0.95" | 950 m || 
|-id=822 bgcolor=#fefefe
| 228822 ||  || — || January 28, 2003 || Palomar || NEAT || — || align=right | 1.2 km || 
|-id=823 bgcolor=#fefefe
| 228823 ||  || — || January 30, 2003 || Palomar || NEAT || NYS || align=right data-sort-value="0.74" | 740 m || 
|-id=824 bgcolor=#fefefe
| 228824 ||  || — || January 30, 2003 || Anderson Mesa || LONEOS || — || align=right | 2.1 km || 
|-id=825 bgcolor=#fefefe
| 228825 ||  || — || January 29, 2003 || Palomar || NEAT || — || align=right | 1.5 km || 
|-id=826 bgcolor=#fefefe
| 228826 ||  || — || January 31, 2003 || Socorro || LINEAR || — || align=right | 1.6 km || 
|-id=827 bgcolor=#fefefe
| 228827 ||  || — || January 26, 2003 || Anderson Mesa || LONEOS || NYS || align=right | 3.0 km || 
|-id=828 bgcolor=#fefefe
| 228828 ||  || — || February 2, 2003 || Palomar || NEAT || — || align=right | 1.2 km || 
|-id=829 bgcolor=#fefefe
| 228829 ||  || — || February 3, 2003 || Anderson Mesa || LONEOS || — || align=right | 1.1 km || 
|-id=830 bgcolor=#fefefe
| 228830 || 2003 DP || — || February 20, 2003 || Haleakala || NEAT || NYS || align=right | 1.1 km || 
|-id=831 bgcolor=#fefefe
| 228831 ||  || — || February 22, 2003 || Palomar || NEAT || MAS || align=right data-sort-value="0.96" | 960 m || 
|-id=832 bgcolor=#fefefe
| 228832 ||  || — || February 22, 2003 || Palomar || NEAT || NYS || align=right data-sort-value="0.73" | 730 m || 
|-id=833 bgcolor=#fefefe
| 228833 ||  || — || February 22, 2003 || Palomar || NEAT || EUTfast? || align=right data-sort-value="0.81" | 810 m || 
|-id=834 bgcolor=#fefefe
| 228834 ||  || — || February 22, 2003 || Palomar || NEAT || MAS || align=right data-sort-value="0.83" | 830 m || 
|-id=835 bgcolor=#fefefe
| 228835 ||  || — || February 22, 2003 || Palomar || NEAT || — || align=right data-sort-value="0.76" | 760 m || 
|-id=836 bgcolor=#fefefe
| 228836 ||  || — || February 22, 2003 || Palomar || NEAT || NYS || align=right | 1.1 km || 
|-id=837 bgcolor=#fefefe
| 228837 ||  || — || March 6, 2003 || Anderson Mesa || LONEOS || MAS || align=right data-sort-value="0.87" | 870 m || 
|-id=838 bgcolor=#fefefe
| 228838 ||  || — || March 6, 2003 || Socorro || LINEAR || — || align=right | 1.0 km || 
|-id=839 bgcolor=#fefefe
| 228839 ||  || — || March 7, 2003 || Palomar || NEAT || — || align=right | 1.3 km || 
|-id=840 bgcolor=#fefefe
| 228840 ||  || — || March 6, 2003 || Anderson Mesa || LONEOS || — || align=right | 1.1 km || 
|-id=841 bgcolor=#fefefe
| 228841 ||  || — || March 6, 2003 || Anderson Mesa || LONEOS || — || align=right | 1.4 km || 
|-id=842 bgcolor=#E9E9E9
| 228842 ||  || — || March 7, 2003 || Anderson Mesa || LONEOS || — || align=right | 1.7 km || 
|-id=843 bgcolor=#fefefe
| 228843 ||  || — || March 8, 2003 || Socorro || LINEAR || — || align=right | 1.2 km || 
|-id=844 bgcolor=#fefefe
| 228844 ||  || — || March 11, 2003 || Palomar || NEAT || NYS || align=right data-sort-value="0.86" | 860 m || 
|-id=845 bgcolor=#fefefe
| 228845 ||  || — || March 7, 2003 || Kitt Peak || Spacewatch || MASfast? || align=right | 1.1 km || 
|-id=846 bgcolor=#fefefe
| 228846 ||  || — || March 6, 2003 || Goodricke-Pigott || R. A. Tucker || ERI || align=right | 2.5 km || 
|-id=847 bgcolor=#fefefe
| 228847 || 2003 FW || — || March 20, 2003 || Palomar || NEAT || PHO || align=right | 1.4 km || 
|-id=848 bgcolor=#fefefe
| 228848 ||  || — || March 23, 2003 || Palomar || NEAT || V || align=right data-sort-value="0.98" | 980 m || 
|-id=849 bgcolor=#fefefe
| 228849 ||  || — || March 23, 2003 || Kitt Peak || Spacewatch || NYS || align=right | 2.2 km || 
|-id=850 bgcolor=#fefefe
| 228850 ||  || — || March 25, 2003 || Palomar || NEAT || — || align=right | 2.6 km || 
|-id=851 bgcolor=#fefefe
| 228851 ||  || — || March 26, 2003 || Palomar || NEAT || — || align=right | 1.3 km || 
|-id=852 bgcolor=#E9E9E9
| 228852 ||  || — || March 27, 2003 || Palomar || NEAT || — || align=right | 1.3 km || 
|-id=853 bgcolor=#fefefe
| 228853 ||  || — || March 28, 2003 || Anderson Mesa || LONEOS || — || align=right | 1.5 km || 
|-id=854 bgcolor=#fefefe
| 228854 ||  || — || March 30, 2003 || Socorro || LINEAR || NYS || align=right data-sort-value="0.94" | 940 m || 
|-id=855 bgcolor=#fefefe
| 228855 ||  || — || March 31, 2003 || Anderson Mesa || LONEOS || NYS || align=right data-sort-value="0.80" | 800 m || 
|-id=856 bgcolor=#fefefe
| 228856 ||  || — || March 23, 2003 || Kitt Peak || Spacewatch || NYS || align=right | 1.0 km || 
|-id=857 bgcolor=#fefefe
| 228857 ||  || — || March 23, 2003 || Palomar || NEAT || V || align=right | 1.1 km || 
|-id=858 bgcolor=#fefefe
| 228858 || 2003 GL || — || April 1, 2003 || Socorro || LINEAR || H || align=right data-sort-value="0.99" | 990 m || 
|-id=859 bgcolor=#fefefe
| 228859 ||  || — || April 1, 2003 || Socorro || LINEAR || — || align=right | 1.1 km || 
|-id=860 bgcolor=#fefefe
| 228860 ||  || — || April 1, 2003 || Socorro || LINEAR || — || align=right | 1.3 km || 
|-id=861 bgcolor=#fefefe
| 228861 ||  || — || April 1, 2003 || Socorro || LINEAR || NYS || align=right data-sort-value="0.95" | 950 m || 
|-id=862 bgcolor=#d6d6d6
| 228862 ||  || — || April 8, 2003 || Palomar || NEAT || Tj (2.94) || align=right | 7.5 km || 
|-id=863 bgcolor=#fefefe
| 228863 ||  || — || April 8, 2003 || Socorro || LINEAR || — || align=right | 3.0 km || 
|-id=864 bgcolor=#fefefe
| 228864 ||  || — || April 7, 2003 || Palomar || NEAT || NYS || align=right data-sort-value="0.84" | 840 m || 
|-id=865 bgcolor=#fefefe
| 228865 ||  || — || April 8, 2003 || Socorro || LINEAR || NYS || align=right | 2.1 km || 
|-id=866 bgcolor=#E9E9E9
| 228866 ||  || — || April 24, 2003 || Anderson Mesa || LONEOS || ADE || align=right | 4.1 km || 
|-id=867 bgcolor=#E9E9E9
| 228867 ||  || — || April 24, 2003 || Anderson Mesa || LONEOS || GEF || align=right | 1.8 km || 
|-id=868 bgcolor=#fefefe
| 228868 ||  || — || April 25, 2003 || Anderson Mesa || LONEOS || — || align=right | 2.9 km || 
|-id=869 bgcolor=#E9E9E9
| 228869 ||  || — || April 27, 2003 || Anderson Mesa || LONEOS || — || align=right | 2.3 km || 
|-id=870 bgcolor=#fefefe
| 228870 ||  || — || April 28, 2003 || Socorro || LINEAR || — || align=right | 1.3 km || 
|-id=871 bgcolor=#E9E9E9
| 228871 ||  || — || April 26, 2003 || Haleakala || NEAT || — || align=right | 4.3 km || 
|-id=872 bgcolor=#E9E9E9
| 228872 ||  || — || April 29, 2003 || Haleakala || NEAT || — || align=right | 3.7 km || 
|-id=873 bgcolor=#fefefe
| 228873 ||  || — || April 29, 2003 || Socorro || LINEAR || — || align=right | 2.7 km || 
|-id=874 bgcolor=#E9E9E9
| 228874 ||  || — || April 30, 2003 || Kitt Peak || Spacewatch || AER || align=right | 1.7 km || 
|-id=875 bgcolor=#E9E9E9
| 228875 ||  || — || May 23, 2003 || Reedy Creek || J. Broughton || — || align=right | 3.7 km || 
|-id=876 bgcolor=#fefefe
| 228876 ||  || — || June 3, 2003 || Socorro || LINEAR || H || align=right data-sort-value="0.99" | 990 m || 
|-id=877 bgcolor=#d6d6d6
| 228877 ||  || — || June 23, 2003 || Anderson Mesa || LONEOS || — || align=right | 7.7 km || 
|-id=878 bgcolor=#E9E9E9
| 228878 ||  || — || June 25, 2003 || Socorro || LINEAR || — || align=right | 2.8 km || 
|-id=879 bgcolor=#E9E9E9
| 228879 || 2003 NF || — || July 1, 2003 || Socorro || LINEAR || — || align=right | 2.5 km || 
|-id=880 bgcolor=#d6d6d6
| 228880 ||  || — || July 27, 2003 || Socorro || LINEAR || EUP || align=right | 6.2 km || 
|-id=881 bgcolor=#d6d6d6
| 228881 ||  || — || July 22, 2003 || Socorro || LINEAR || — || align=right | 6.3 km || 
|-id=882 bgcolor=#d6d6d6
| 228882 ||  || — || July 29, 2003 || Reedy Creek || J. Broughton || — || align=right | 4.1 km || 
|-id=883 bgcolor=#d6d6d6
| 228883 Cliffsimak ||  ||  || August 2, 2003 || Saint-Sulpice || B. Christophe || EOS || align=right | 3.2 km || 
|-id=884 bgcolor=#d6d6d6
| 228884 ||  || — || August 20, 2003 || Palomar || NEAT || — || align=right | 4.0 km || 
|-id=885 bgcolor=#d6d6d6
| 228885 ||  || — || August 22, 2003 || Palomar || NEAT || — || align=right | 5.0 km || 
|-id=886 bgcolor=#d6d6d6
| 228886 ||  || — || August 21, 2003 || Campo Imperatore || CINEOS || — || align=right | 4.5 km || 
|-id=887 bgcolor=#E9E9E9
| 228887 ||  || — || August 21, 2003 || Palomar || NEAT || — || align=right | 3.3 km || 
|-id=888 bgcolor=#E9E9E9
| 228888 ||  || — || August 23, 2003 || Palomar || NEAT || AGN || align=right | 2.0 km || 
|-id=889 bgcolor=#d6d6d6
| 228889 ||  || — || August 22, 2003 || Bergisch Gladbach || W. Bickel || — || align=right | 4.6 km || 
|-id=890 bgcolor=#d6d6d6
| 228890 ||  || — || August 24, 2003 || Socorro || LINEAR || — || align=right | 6.4 km || 
|-id=891 bgcolor=#d6d6d6
| 228891 ||  || — || August 28, 2003 || Socorro || LINEAR || — || align=right | 6.7 km || 
|-id=892 bgcolor=#d6d6d6
| 228892 ||  || — || August 31, 2003 || Haleakala || NEAT || LIX || align=right | 5.2 km || 
|-id=893 bgcolor=#E9E9E9
| 228893 Gerevich ||  ||  || September 6, 2003 || Piszkéstető || K. Sárneczky, B. Sipőcz || AGN || align=right | 1.6 km || 
|-id=894 bgcolor=#d6d6d6
| 228894 ||  || — || September 13, 2003 || Haleakala || NEAT || — || align=right | 5.5 km || 
|-id=895 bgcolor=#d6d6d6
| 228895 ||  || — || September 15, 2003 || Haleakala || NEAT || — || align=right | 4.5 km || 
|-id=896 bgcolor=#fefefe
| 228896 ||  || — || September 17, 2003 || Socorro || LINEAR || H || align=right | 1.4 km || 
|-id=897 bgcolor=#d6d6d6
| 228897 ||  || — || September 16, 2003 || Palomar || NEAT || EOS || align=right | 3.2 km || 
|-id=898 bgcolor=#d6d6d6
| 228898 ||  || — || September 18, 2003 || Palomar || NEAT || EMA || align=right | 7.0 km || 
|-id=899 bgcolor=#d6d6d6
| 228899 ||  || — || September 17, 2003 || Anderson Mesa || LONEOS || — || align=right | 4.2 km || 
|-id=900 bgcolor=#d6d6d6
| 228900 ||  || — || September 17, 2003 || Kitt Peak || Spacewatch || — || align=right | 4.0 km || 
|}

228901–229000 

|-bgcolor=#d6d6d6
| 228901 ||  || — || September 18, 2003 || Kitt Peak || Spacewatch || — || align=right | 5.2 km || 
|-id=902 bgcolor=#d6d6d6
| 228902 ||  || — || September 19, 2003 || Kitt Peak || Spacewatch || TIR || align=right | 3.2 km || 
|-id=903 bgcolor=#d6d6d6
| 228903 ||  || — || September 20, 2003 || Palomar || NEAT || — || align=right | 4.6 km || 
|-id=904 bgcolor=#d6d6d6
| 228904 ||  || — || September 20, 2003 || Kitt Peak || Spacewatch || EOS || align=right | 3.4 km || 
|-id=905 bgcolor=#d6d6d6
| 228905 ||  || — || September 19, 2003 || Socorro || LINEAR || — || align=right | 6.2 km || 
|-id=906 bgcolor=#d6d6d6
| 228906 ||  || — || September 19, 2003 || Palomar || NEAT || LIX || align=right | 6.0 km || 
|-id=907 bgcolor=#d6d6d6
| 228907 ||  || — || September 20, 2003 || Socorro || LINEAR || — || align=right | 4.1 km || 
|-id=908 bgcolor=#d6d6d6
| 228908 ||  || — || September 20, 2003 || Palomar || NEAT || — || align=right | 5.6 km || 
|-id=909 bgcolor=#d6d6d6
| 228909 ||  || — || September 20, 2003 || Palomar || NEAT || — || align=right | 6.1 km || 
|-id=910 bgcolor=#d6d6d6
| 228910 ||  || — || September 19, 2003 || Anderson Mesa || LONEOS || CHA || align=right | 3.6 km || 
|-id=911 bgcolor=#d6d6d6
| 228911 ||  || — || September 20, 2003 || Anderson Mesa || LONEOS || — || align=right | 7.2 km || 
|-id=912 bgcolor=#d6d6d6
| 228912 ||  || — || September 23, 2003 || Haleakala || NEAT || HYG || align=right | 4.1 km || 
|-id=913 bgcolor=#d6d6d6
| 228913 ||  || — || September 21, 2003 || Kitt Peak || Spacewatch || — || align=right | 4.8 km || 
|-id=914 bgcolor=#d6d6d6
| 228914 ||  || — || September 22, 2003 || Kitt Peak || Spacewatch || THM || align=right | 4.3 km || 
|-id=915 bgcolor=#d6d6d6
| 228915 ||  || — || September 23, 2003 || Palomar || NEAT || VER || align=right | 3.4 km || 
|-id=916 bgcolor=#d6d6d6
| 228916 ||  || — || September 26, 2003 || Desert Eagle || W. K. Y. Yeung || — || align=right | 4.4 km || 
|-id=917 bgcolor=#d6d6d6
| 228917 ||  || — || September 28, 2003 || Sierra Nevada || Sierra Nevada Obs. || — || align=right | 5.7 km || 
|-id=918 bgcolor=#d6d6d6
| 228918 ||  || — || September 26, 2003 || Socorro || LINEAR || EOS || align=right | 3.8 km || 
|-id=919 bgcolor=#d6d6d6
| 228919 ||  || — || September 26, 2003 || Socorro || LINEAR || — || align=right | 2.9 km || 
|-id=920 bgcolor=#d6d6d6
| 228920 ||  || — || September 25, 2003 || Palomar || NEAT || HYG || align=right | 4.8 km || 
|-id=921 bgcolor=#d6d6d6
| 228921 ||  || — || September 27, 2003 || Socorro || LINEAR || 7:4* || align=right | 4.8 km || 
|-id=922 bgcolor=#d6d6d6
| 228922 ||  || — || September 26, 2003 || Socorro || LINEAR || THM || align=right | 2.8 km || 
|-id=923 bgcolor=#d6d6d6
| 228923 ||  || — || September 27, 2003 || Kitt Peak || Spacewatch || — || align=right | 4.9 km || 
|-id=924 bgcolor=#d6d6d6
| 228924 ||  || — || September 28, 2003 || Kitt Peak || Spacewatch || — || align=right | 3.9 km || 
|-id=925 bgcolor=#d6d6d6
| 228925 ||  || — || September 29, 2003 || Kitt Peak || Spacewatch || — || align=right | 5.0 km || 
|-id=926 bgcolor=#d6d6d6
| 228926 ||  || — || September 29, 2003 || Socorro || LINEAR || THM || align=right | 2.7 km || 
|-id=927 bgcolor=#d6d6d6
| 228927 ||  || — || September 20, 2003 || Socorro || LINEAR || — || align=right | 3.4 km || 
|-id=928 bgcolor=#d6d6d6
| 228928 ||  || — || September 20, 2003 || Socorro || LINEAR || — || align=right | 4.1 km || 
|-id=929 bgcolor=#d6d6d6
| 228929 ||  || — || September 29, 2003 || Anderson Mesa || LONEOS || TIR || align=right | 7.2 km || 
|-id=930 bgcolor=#d6d6d6
| 228930 ||  || — || September 28, 2003 || Socorro || LINEAR || THM || align=right | 3.3 km || 
|-id=931 bgcolor=#d6d6d6
| 228931 ||  || — || September 29, 2003 || Socorro || LINEAR || — || align=right | 2.4 km || 
|-id=932 bgcolor=#d6d6d6
| 228932 ||  || — || September 16, 2003 || Palomar || NEAT || — || align=right | 4.1 km || 
|-id=933 bgcolor=#d6d6d6
| 228933 ||  || — || September 18, 2003 || Campo Imperatore || CINEOS || — || align=right | 5.4 km || 
|-id=934 bgcolor=#d6d6d6
| 228934 ||  || — || September 26, 2003 || Apache Point || SDSS || — || align=right | 2.9 km || 
|-id=935 bgcolor=#d6d6d6
| 228935 ||  || — || September 18, 2003 || Palomar || NEAT || — || align=right | 4.1 km || 
|-id=936 bgcolor=#d6d6d6
| 228936 ||  || — || September 26, 2003 || Apache Point || SDSS || HYG || align=right | 3.1 km || 
|-id=937 bgcolor=#d6d6d6
| 228937 ||  || — || September 28, 2003 || Apache Point || SDSS || — || align=right | 3.0 km || 
|-id=938 bgcolor=#d6d6d6
| 228938 || 2003 TR || — || October 1, 2003 || Drebach || Drebach Obs. || — || align=right | 4.2 km || 
|-id=939 bgcolor=#d6d6d6
| 228939 ||  || — || October 1, 2003 || Anderson Mesa || LONEOS || EOS || align=right | 3.0 km || 
|-id=940 bgcolor=#d6d6d6
| 228940 ||  || — || October 14, 2003 || Anderson Mesa || LONEOS || — || align=right | 5.6 km || 
|-id=941 bgcolor=#d6d6d6
| 228941 ||  || — || October 14, 2003 || Palomar || NEAT || — || align=right | 3.7 km || 
|-id=942 bgcolor=#d6d6d6
| 228942 ||  || — || October 14, 2003 || Palomar || NEAT || EOS || align=right | 3.0 km || 
|-id=943 bgcolor=#d6d6d6
| 228943 ||  || — || October 3, 2003 || Haleakala || NEAT || — || align=right | 5.7 km || 
|-id=944 bgcolor=#d6d6d6
| 228944 ||  || — || October 5, 2003 || Kitt Peak || Spacewatch || VER || align=right | 4.4 km || 
|-id=945 bgcolor=#d6d6d6
| 228945 ||  || — || October 5, 2003 || Socorro || LINEAR || — || align=right | 6.1 km || 
|-id=946 bgcolor=#d6d6d6
| 228946 ||  || — || October 5, 2003 || Socorro || LINEAR || — || align=right | 5.6 km || 
|-id=947 bgcolor=#d6d6d6
| 228947 ||  || — || October 3, 2003 || Kitt Peak || Spacewatch || — || align=right | 3.5 km || 
|-id=948 bgcolor=#d6d6d6
| 228948 ||  || — || October 16, 2003 || Socorro || LINEAR || — || align=right | 5.0 km || 
|-id=949 bgcolor=#d6d6d6
| 228949 ||  || — || October 18, 2003 || Palomar || NEAT || — || align=right | 7.5 km || 
|-id=950 bgcolor=#d6d6d6
| 228950 ||  || — || October 18, 2003 || Palomar || NEAT || — || align=right | 4.9 km || 
|-id=951 bgcolor=#d6d6d6
| 228951 ||  || — || October 17, 2003 || Anderson Mesa || LONEOS || EOS || align=right | 3.4 km || 
|-id=952 bgcolor=#d6d6d6
| 228952 ||  || — || October 17, 2003 || Anderson Mesa || LONEOS || — || align=right | 4.8 km || 
|-id=953 bgcolor=#d6d6d6
| 228953 ||  || — || October 18, 2003 || Haleakala || NEAT || — || align=right | 5.0 km || 
|-id=954 bgcolor=#d6d6d6
| 228954 ||  || — || October 18, 2003 || Kitt Peak || Spacewatch || THM || align=right | 2.9 km || 
|-id=955 bgcolor=#d6d6d6
| 228955 ||  || — || October 19, 2003 || Anderson Mesa || LONEOS || — || align=right | 6.1 km || 
|-id=956 bgcolor=#d6d6d6
| 228956 ||  || — || October 19, 2003 || Palomar || NEAT || LIX || align=right | 4.7 km || 
|-id=957 bgcolor=#d6d6d6
| 228957 ||  || — || October 20, 2003 || Socorro || LINEAR || EOS || align=right | 3.7 km || 
|-id=958 bgcolor=#d6d6d6
| 228958 ||  || — || October 20, 2003 || Socorro || LINEAR || LIX || align=right | 7.6 km || 
|-id=959 bgcolor=#d6d6d6
| 228959 ||  || — || October 20, 2003 || Socorro || LINEAR || — || align=right | 3.8 km || 
|-id=960 bgcolor=#d6d6d6
| 228960 ||  || — || October 20, 2003 || Socorro || LINEAR || — || align=right | 3.6 km || 
|-id=961 bgcolor=#d6d6d6
| 228961 ||  || — || October 20, 2003 || Socorro || LINEAR || — || align=right | 3.8 km || 
|-id=962 bgcolor=#d6d6d6
| 228962 ||  || — || October 20, 2003 || Palomar || NEAT || — || align=right | 5.4 km || 
|-id=963 bgcolor=#d6d6d6
| 228963 ||  || — || October 16, 2003 || Palomar || NEAT || — || align=right | 4.7 km || 
|-id=964 bgcolor=#d6d6d6
| 228964 ||  || — || October 16, 2003 || Palomar || NEAT || — || align=right | 3.7 km || 
|-id=965 bgcolor=#d6d6d6
| 228965 ||  || — || October 18, 2003 || Anderson Mesa || LONEOS || HYG || align=right | 3.5 km || 
|-id=966 bgcolor=#d6d6d6
| 228966 ||  || — || October 21, 2003 || Kitt Peak || Spacewatch || HYG || align=right | 4.8 km || 
|-id=967 bgcolor=#d6d6d6
| 228967 ||  || — || October 21, 2003 || Socorro || LINEAR || — || align=right | 4.2 km || 
|-id=968 bgcolor=#d6d6d6
| 228968 ||  || — || October 19, 2003 || Kitt Peak || Spacewatch || EOS || align=right | 4.9 km || 
|-id=969 bgcolor=#d6d6d6
| 228969 ||  || — || October 21, 2003 || Kitt Peak || Spacewatch || — || align=right | 4.9 km || 
|-id=970 bgcolor=#d6d6d6
| 228970 ||  || — || October 21, 2003 || Kitt Peak || Spacewatch || — || align=right | 4.5 km || 
|-id=971 bgcolor=#d6d6d6
| 228971 ||  || — || October 21, 2003 || Socorro || LINEAR || — || align=right | 6.0 km || 
|-id=972 bgcolor=#d6d6d6
| 228972 ||  || — || October 22, 2003 || Kitt Peak || Spacewatch || — || align=right | 3.8 km || 
|-id=973 bgcolor=#d6d6d6
| 228973 ||  || — || October 21, 2003 || Socorro || LINEAR || — || align=right | 4.1 km || 
|-id=974 bgcolor=#d6d6d6
| 228974 ||  || — || October 22, 2003 || Kitt Peak || Spacewatch || HYG || align=right | 3.7 km || 
|-id=975 bgcolor=#d6d6d6
| 228975 ||  || — || October 25, 2003 || Socorro || LINEAR || HYG || align=right | 3.4 km || 
|-id=976 bgcolor=#d6d6d6
| 228976 ||  || — || October 28, 2003 || Socorro || LINEAR || — || align=right | 6.1 km || 
|-id=977 bgcolor=#d6d6d6
| 228977 ||  || — || October 17, 2003 || Palomar || NEAT || — || align=right | 5.8 km || 
|-id=978 bgcolor=#d6d6d6
| 228978 ||  || — || October 29, 2003 || Kitt Peak || Spacewatch || — || align=right | 3.9 km || 
|-id=979 bgcolor=#d6d6d6
| 228979 ||  || — || October 29, 2003 || Haleakala || NEAT || — || align=right | 4.7 km || 
|-id=980 bgcolor=#d6d6d6
| 228980 ||  || — || October 23, 2003 || Kitt Peak || M. W. Buie || THM || align=right | 3.2 km || 
|-id=981 bgcolor=#d6d6d6
| 228981 ||  || — || October 22, 2003 || Kitt Peak || Spacewatch || — || align=right | 4.8 km || 
|-id=982 bgcolor=#d6d6d6
| 228982 ||  || — || October 23, 2003 || Kitt Peak || Spacewatch || — || align=right | 2.7 km || 
|-id=983 bgcolor=#d6d6d6
| 228983 ||  || — || October 16, 2003 || Kitt Peak || Spacewatch || — || align=right | 3.5 km || 
|-id=984 bgcolor=#d6d6d6
| 228984 ||  || — || October 22, 2003 || Apache Point || SDSS || — || align=right | 4.2 km || 
|-id=985 bgcolor=#d6d6d6
| 228985 ||  || — || November 15, 2003 || Kitt Peak || Spacewatch || THM || align=right | 4.1 km || 
|-id=986 bgcolor=#d6d6d6
| 228986 ||  || — || November 4, 2003 || Socorro || LINEAR || EUP || align=right | 5.9 km || 
|-id=987 bgcolor=#d6d6d6
| 228987 ||  || — || November 18, 2003 || Palomar || NEAT || HYG || align=right | 3.8 km || 
|-id=988 bgcolor=#d6d6d6
| 228988 ||  || — || November 18, 2003 || Kitt Peak || Spacewatch || — || align=right | 3.5 km || 
|-id=989 bgcolor=#d6d6d6
| 228989 ||  || — || November 18, 2003 || Palomar || NEAT || — || align=right | 4.8 km || 
|-id=990 bgcolor=#d6d6d6
| 228990 ||  || — || November 19, 2003 || Socorro || LINEAR || — || align=right | 4.6 km || 
|-id=991 bgcolor=#d6d6d6
| 228991 ||  || — || November 20, 2003 || Socorro || LINEAR || — || align=right | 5.3 km || 
|-id=992 bgcolor=#d6d6d6
| 228992 ||  || — || November 20, 2003 || Socorro || LINEAR || — || align=right | 4.9 km || 
|-id=993 bgcolor=#d6d6d6
| 228993 ||  || — || November 20, 2003 || Socorro || LINEAR || — || align=right | 4.0 km || 
|-id=994 bgcolor=#d6d6d6
| 228994 ||  || — || November 21, 2003 || Palomar || NEAT || — || align=right | 6.4 km || 
|-id=995 bgcolor=#d6d6d6
| 228995 ||  || — || November 19, 2003 || Anderson Mesa || LONEOS || — || align=right | 7.1 km || 
|-id=996 bgcolor=#d6d6d6
| 228996 ||  || — || November 21, 2003 || Socorro || LINEAR || — || align=right | 3.5 km || 
|-id=997 bgcolor=#d6d6d6
| 228997 ||  || — || November 21, 2003 || Catalina || CSS || ALA || align=right | 6.9 km || 
|-id=998 bgcolor=#d6d6d6
| 228998 ||  || — || November 20, 2003 || Socorro || LINEAR || — || align=right | 4.8 km || 
|-id=999 bgcolor=#d6d6d6
| 228999 ||  || — || November 21, 2003 || Socorro || LINEAR || — || align=right | 8.4 km || 
|-id=000 bgcolor=#d6d6d6
| 229000 ||  || — || November 24, 2003 || Palomar || NEAT || EUP || align=right | 6.1 km || 
|}

References

External links 
 Discovery Circumstances: Numbered Minor Planets (225001)–(230000) (IAU Minor Planet Center)

0228